= List of circulating currencies =

There are 180 currencies recognized as legal tender in United Nations (UN) member states, UN General Assembly non-member observer states, partially recognized or unrecognized states, and their dependencies. However, excluding the pegged (fixed exchange rate) currencies, there are only 130 currencies that float independently or are pegged to a currency basket.

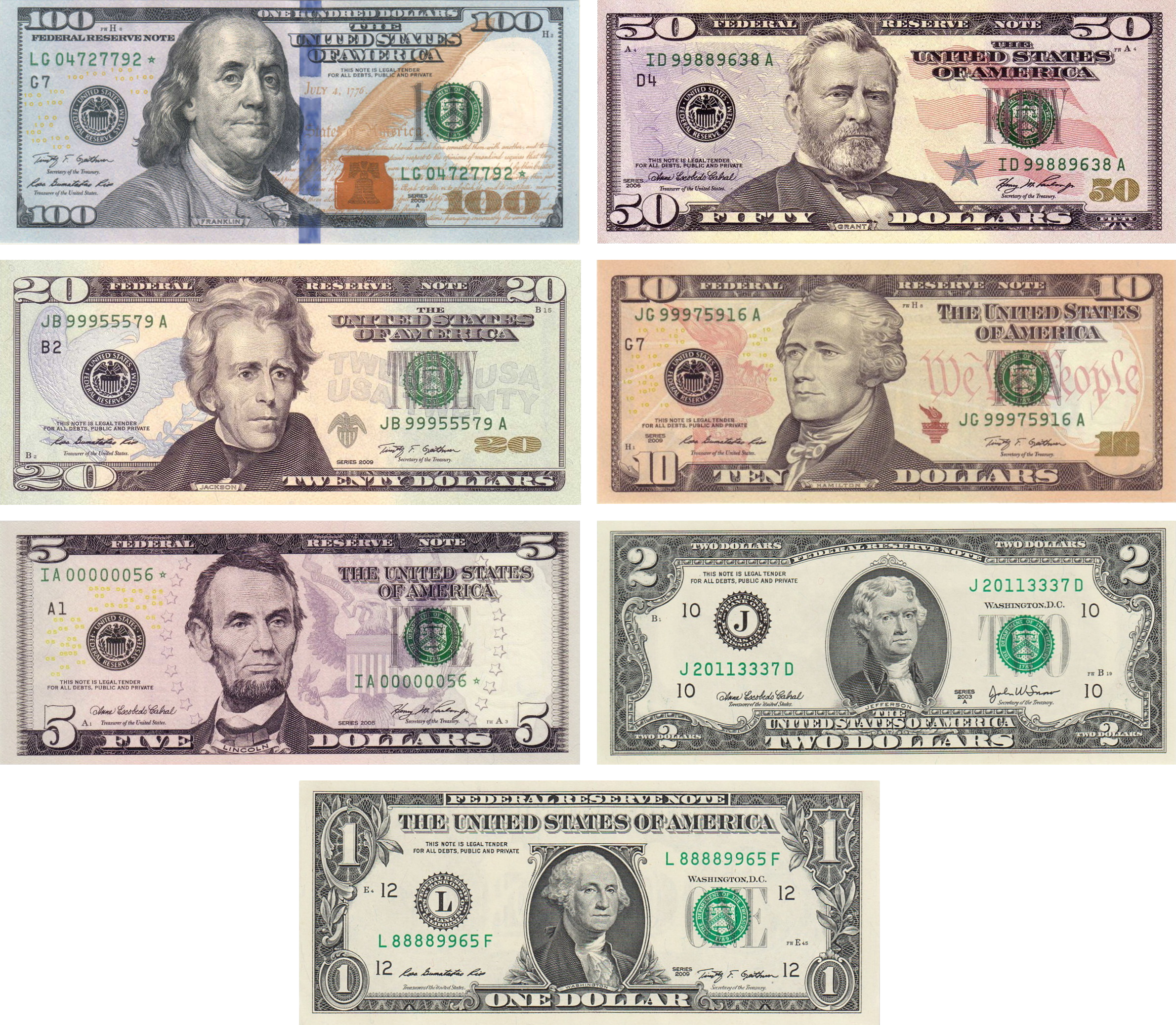
U.S. dollar, the official currency of the United States, the world's dominant reserve currency and the most traded currency globally.

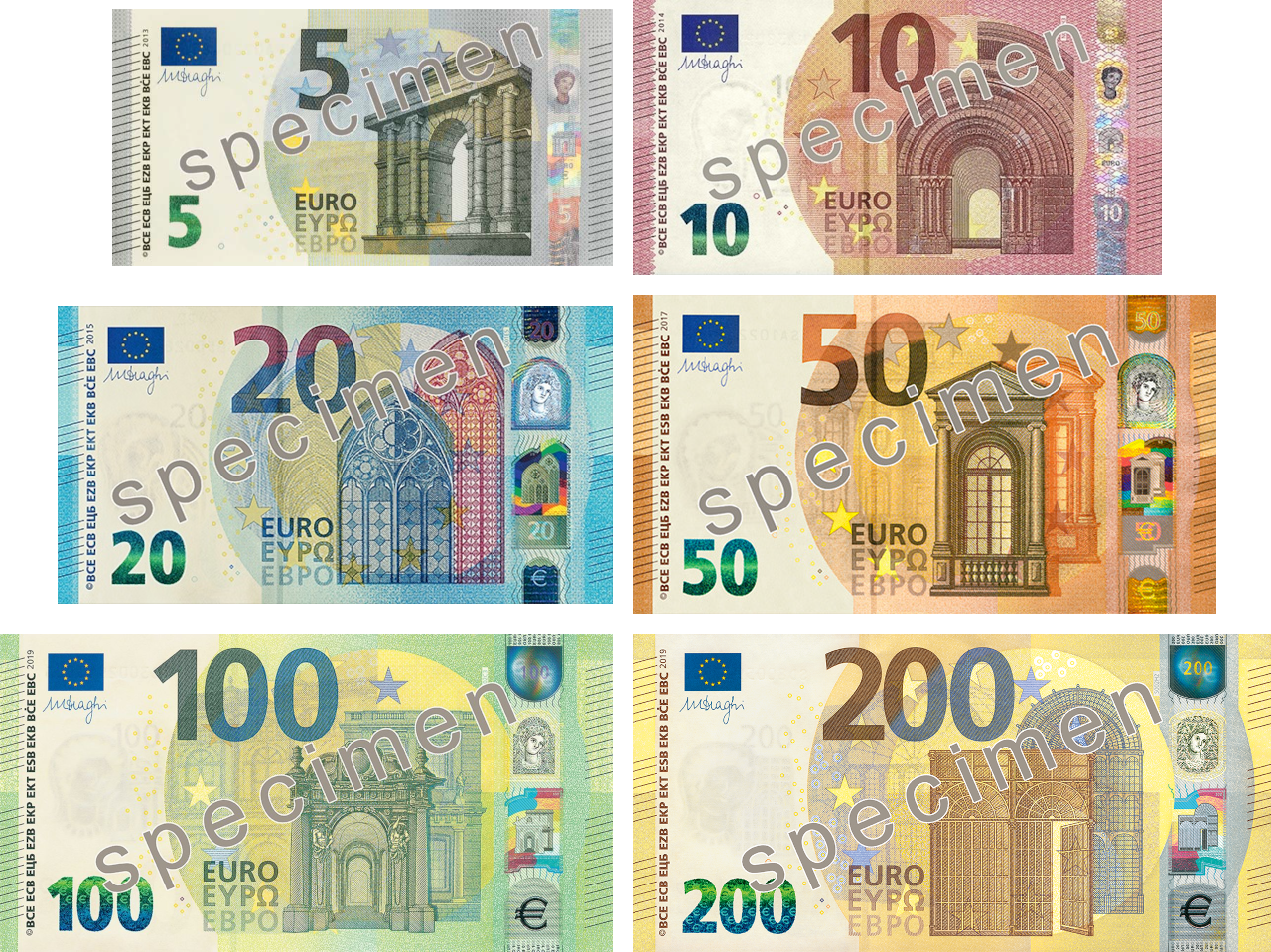
Euro, the currency used by the most countries and territories, the second-largest reserve currency and the second-most traded currency.

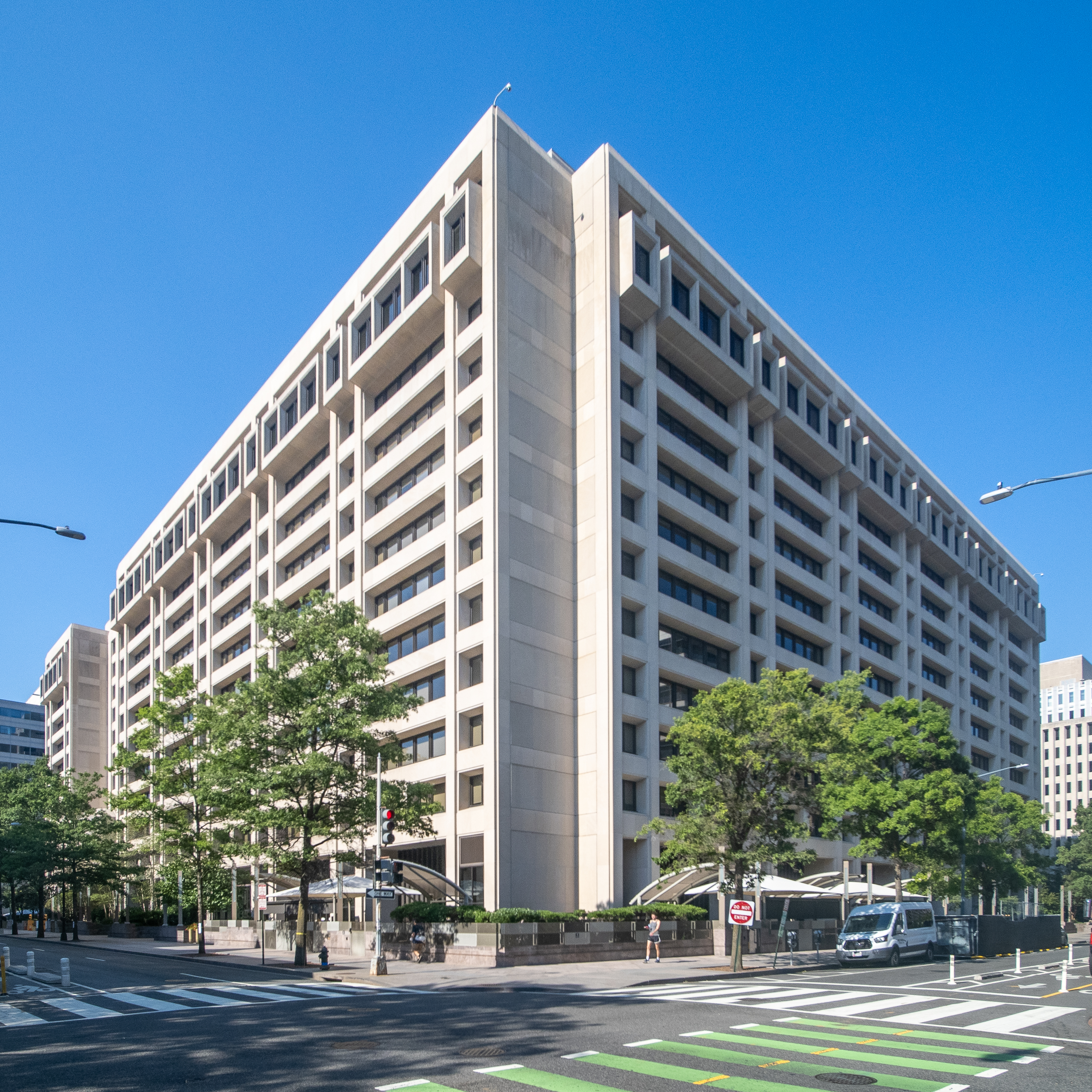
The International Monetary Fund headquarters in Washington, D.C.. The IMF is primarily focused on the stability of the global monetary system and oversee the currencies of the world.

== Criteria for inclusion ==
A currency is a kind of money and medium of exchange. Currency includes paper, cotton, or polymer banknotes and metal coins. States generally have a monopoly on the issuing of currency, although some states share currencies with other states. For the purposes of this list, only currencies that are legal tender, including those used in actual commerce or issued for commemorative purposes, are considered "circulating currencies". This includes fractional units that have no physical form but are recognized by the issuing state, such as the United States mill, (Note: One cent equals ten mills.) the Egyptian millieme, (Note: One piastre equals ten milliemes.) and the Japanese rin. (Note: One sen equals ten rin.) Currencies used by non-state entities, like the Sovereign Military Order of Malta, scrips used by private entities, and other private, virtual, and alternative currencies are not included on this list.

Dependencies and unrecognized states are listed here only if another currency is used on their territory that is different from that of the state that administers them or has jurisdiction over them.

== List of circulating currencies by state or territory ==
Colour key and notes
— indicates that a given currency is pegged to another currency (details)
Italics — indicates a state or territory with limited international recognition
The inclusion of a minor (fractional) unit in this list does not imply that that unit is currently in practical use in the state or territory shown.

State or territory	Currency	Symbol (Note: Many of these symbols can be found in Unicode block 20A0–20, "Currency Symbols".) or Abbrev.	ISO code	Fractional unit	Number to basic
Abkhazia	Abkhazian apsar (Note: This currency is not used in day-to-day commerce, but is legal tender. It is minted or printed as commemorative banknotes, coinage, or both.)	аԥ	(none)	(none)	(none)
Abkhazia	Russian ruble	₽	RUB	Kopeck	100
Afghanistan	Afghan afghani	؋	AFN	Pul	100
Akrotiri and Dhekelia	Euro	€	EUR	Cent	100
Albania	Albanian lek	L	ALL	Qintar	100
Algeria	Algerian dinar	DA	DZD	Centime	100
Andorra	Euro	€	EUR	Cent	100
Angola	Angolan kwanza	Kz	AOA	Cêntimo	100
Anguilla	Eastern Caribbean dollar	EC$	XCD	Cent	100
Antigua and Barbuda	Eastern Caribbean dollar	EC$	XCD	Cent	100
Argentina	Argentine peso	$	ARS	Centavo	100
Armenia	Armenian dram	֏	AMD	Luma	100
Aruba	Aruban florin	ƒ	AWG	Cent	100
Ascension Island	Saint Helena pound	£	SHP	Penny	100
Australia	Australian dollar	$	AUD	Cent	100
Austria	Euro	€	EUR	Cent	100
Azerbaijan	Azerbaijani manat	₼	AZN	Qəpik	100
Bahamas, The	Bahamian dollar	$	BSD	Cent	100
Bahrain	Bahraini dinar	BD	BHD	Fils	1000
Bangladesh	Bangladeshi taka	৳	BDT	Poisha	100
Barbados	Barbadian dollar	$	BBD	Cent	100
Belarus	Belarusian ruble		BYN	Kopeck	100
Belgium	Euro	€	EUR	Cent	100
Belize	Belize dollar	$	BZD	Cent	100
Benin	West African CFA franc	F.CFA	XOF	Centime	100
Bermuda	Bermudian dollar	$	BMD	Cent	100
Bhutan	Bhutanese ngultrum (Note: The currency is pegged at par with the Indian rupee; both currencies are accepted in Bhutan.)	Nu	BTN	Chetrum	100
Bhutan	Indian rupee	₹	INR	Paisa	100
Bolivia	Bolivian boliviano	Bs	BOB	Centavo	100
Bonaire	United States dollar (Note: Although part of the Netherlands, the islands of Bonaire, Sint Eustatius, and Saba do not use the euro; they use the United States dollar. They are listed separately.)	$	USD	Cent	100
Bosnia and Herzegovina	Bosnia and Herzegovina convertible mark	KM	BAM	Fening	100
Botswana	Botswana pula	P	BWP	Thebe	100
Brazil	Brazilian real	R$	BRL	Centavo	100
British Virgin Islands	United States dollar	$	USD	Cent	100
Brunei (Note: The Brunei dollar is also accepted as customary tender in Singapore according to the Currency Interchangeability Agreement between the Monetary Authority of Singapore and the Autoriti Monetari Brunei Darussalam (Monetary Authority of Brunei Darussalam). Likewise, the Singapore dollar is also customarily accepted in Brunei.)	Brunei dollar	$	BND	Sen	100
Brunei	Singapore dollar	$	SGD	Cent	100
Bulgaria	Euro	€	EUR	Cent	100
Burkina Faso	West African CFA franc	F.CFA	XOF	Centime	100
Burundi	Burundian franc	FBu	BIF	Centime	100
Cambodia	Cambodian riel	៛	KHR	Sen	100
Cameroon	Central African CFA franc	F.CFA	XAF	Centime	100
Canada	Canadian dollar	$	CAD	Cent	100
Cape Verde	Cape Verdean escudo		CVE	Centavo	100
Cayman Islands	Cayman Islands dollar	$	KYD	Cent	100
Central African Republic	Central African CFA franc	F.CFA	XAF	Centime	100
Chad	Central African CFA franc	F.CFA	XAF	Centime	100
Chile	Chilean peso	$	CLP	Centavo	100
China	Renminbi	¥	CNY	Jiao (Note: One jiao equals ten fen.)	10
Colombia	Colombian peso	$	COP	Centavo	100
Comoros	Comorian franc	FC	KMF	(none)	(none)
Congo, Democratic Republic of the	Congolese franc	FC	CDF	Centime	100
Congo, Republic of the	Central African CFA franc	F.CFA	XAF	Centime	100
Cook Islands	Cook Islands dollar	$	(none)	Cent	100
Cook Islands	New Zealand dollar	$	NZD	Cent	100
Costa Rica	Costa Rican colón	₡	CRC	Céntimo	100
Croatia	Euro	€	EUR	Cent	100
Cuba	Cuban peso	$	CUP	Centavo	100
Curaçao	Caribbean guilder	Cg	XCG	Cent	100
Cyprus	Euro	€	EUR	Cent	100
Czech Republic	Czech koruna	Kč	CZK	Heller	100
Denmark	Danish krone	kr	DKK	Øre	100
Djibouti	Djiboutian franc	Fdj	DJF	(none)	(none)
Dominica	Eastern Caribbean dollar	EC$	XCD	Cent	100
Dominican Republic	Dominican peso	$	DOP	Centavo	100
Ecuador	United States dollar	$	USD	Centavo	100
Egypt	Egyptian pound	LE	EGP	Piastre	100
El Salvador	United States dollar	$	USD	Cent	100
Equatorial Guinea	Central African CFA franc	F.CFA	XAF	Centime	100
Eritrea	Eritrean nakfa	Nkf	ERN	Cent	100
Estonia	Euro	€	EUR	Cent	100
Eswatini	Swazi lilangeni	L or E (pl.)	SZL	Cent	100
Eswatini	South African rand	R	ZAR	Cent	100
Ethiopia	Ethiopian birr	Br	ETB	Santim	100
Falkland Islands	Falkland Islands pound	£	FKP	Penny	100
Falkland Islands	Sterling	£	GBP	Penny	100
Faroe Islands	Danish krone	kr	DKK	Øre	100
Faroe Islands	Faroese króna	kr	(none)	Oyra	100
Fiji	Fijian dollar	$	FJD	Cent	100
Finland	Euro	€	EUR	Cent	100
France	Euro	€	EUR	Cent	100
French Polynesia	CFP franc	F	XPF	Centime	100
Gabon	Central African CFA franc	F.CFA	XAF	Centime	100
Gambia, The	Gambian dalasi	D	GMD	Butut	100
Georgia	Georgian lari	₾	GEL	Tetri	100
Germany	Euro	€	EUR	Cent	100
Ghana	Ghanaian cedi	₵	GHS	Pesewa	100
Gibraltar	Gibraltar pound	£	GIP	Penny	100
Gibraltar	Sterling	£	GBP	Penny	100
Greece	Euro	€	EUR	Cent	100
Greenland	Danish krone	kr	DKK	Øre	100
Grenada	Eastern Caribbean dollar	EC$	XCD	Cent	100
Guatemala	Guatemalan quetzal	Q	GTQ	Centavo	100
Bailiwick of Guernsey	Guernsey pound	£	(none)	Penny	100
Bailiwick of Guernsey	Sterling	£	GBP	Penny	100
Guinea	Guinean franc	Fr	GNF	(none)	(none)
Guinea-Bissau	West African CFA franc	F.CFA	XOF	Centime	100
Guyana	Guyanese dollar	$	GYD	Cent	100
Ivory Coast	West African CFA franc	F.CFA	XOF	Centime	100
Haiti	Haitian gourde	G	HTG	Centime	100
Honduras	Honduran lempira	L	HNL	Centavo	100
Hong Kong	Hong Kong dollar	$	HKD	Cent	100
Hungary	Hungarian forint	Ft	HUF	none (Note: Formerly Fillér (until 1999))	100
Iceland	Icelandic króna	kr	ISK	Eyrir	100
India	Indian rupee	₹	INR	Paisa	100
Indonesia	Indonesian rupiah	Rp	IDR	Sen	100
Iran	Iranian rial	Rl or Rls (pl.)	IRR	Dinar	100
Iraq	Iraqi dinar	ID	IQD	Fils	1000
Ireland	Euro	€	EUR	Cent	100
Isle of Man	Manx pound	£	(none)	Penny	100
Isle of Man	Sterling	£	GBP	Penny	100
Israel	Israeli new shekel	₪	ILS	Agora	100
Italy	Euro	€	EUR	Cent	100
Jamaica	Jamaican dollar	$	JMD	Cent	100
Japan	Japanese yen	¥	JPY	Sen	100
Jersey	Jersey pound	£	(none)	Penny	100
Jersey	Sterling	£	GBP	Penny	100
Jordan	Jordanian dinar	JD	JOD	Piastre (Note: One piastre equals ten fulūs and one dirham equals 10 piastres.)	100
Kazakhstan	Kazakhstani tenge	₸	KZT	Tıyn	100
Kenya	Kenyan shilling	Sh or Shs (pl.)	KES	Cent	100
Kiribati	Kiribati dollar	$	(none)	Cent	100
Kiribati	Australian dollar	$	AUD	Cent	100
Kosovo	Euro	€	EUR	Cent	100
Kuwait	Kuwaiti dinar	KD	KWD	Fils	1000
Kyrgyzstan	Kyrgyz som	⃀	KGS	Tyiyn	100
Laos	Lao kip	₭	LAK	Att	100
Latvia	Euro	€	EUR	Cent	100
Lebanon	Lebanese pound	LL	LBP	Piastre	100
Lesotho	Lesotho loti	L or M (pl.)	LSL	Sente	100
Lesotho	South African rand	R	ZAR	Cent	100
South Georgia and the South Sandwich Islands	Falkland Islands pound	£	FKP	Penny	100
South Georgia and the South Sandwich Islands	Sterling	£	GBP	Penny	100
Liberia	Liberian dollar	$	LRD	Cent	100
Liberia	United States dollar	$	USD	Cent	100
Libya	Libyan dinar	LD	LYD	Dirham	1000
Liechtenstein	Swiss franc	Fr	CHF	Rappen	100
Lithuania	Euro	€	EUR	Cent	100
Luxembourg	Euro	€	EUR	Cent	100
Macau	Macanese pataca	$ or ptc	MOP	Avo	100
Madagascar	Malagasy ariary	Ar	MGA	Iraimbilanja	5
Malawi	Malawian kwacha	K	MWK	Tambala	100
Malaysia	Malaysian ringgit	RM	MYR	Sen	100
Maldives	Maldivian rufiyaa	Rf or ⃂	MVR	Laari	100
Mali	West African CFA franc	F.CFA	XOF	Centime	100
Malta	Euro	€	EUR	Cent	100
Marshall Islands	United States dollar	$	USD	Cent	100
Mauritania	Mauritanian ouguiya	UM	MRU	Khoums	5
Mauritius	Mauritian rupee	Re or Rs (pl.)	MUR	Cent	100
Mexico	Mexican peso	$	MXN	Centavo	100
Micronesia	United States dollar	$	USD	Cent	100
Moldova	Moldovan leu	Leu or Lei (pl.)	MDL	Ban	100
Monaco	Euro	€	EUR	Cent	100
Mongolia	Mongolian tögrög	₮	MNT	Möngö	100
Montenegro	Euro	€	EUR	Cent	100
Montserrat	Eastern Caribbean dollar	EC$	XCD	Cent	100
Morocco	Moroccan dirham	DH	MAD	Centime	100
Mozambique	Mozambican metical	Mt	MZN	Centavo	100
Myanmar	Burmese kyat	K or Ks (pl.)	MMK	Pya	100
Namibia	Namibian dollar	$	NAD	Cent	100
Namibia	South African rand	R	ZAR	Cent	100
Nauru	Australian dollar	$	AUD	Cent	100
Nepal	Nepalese rupee	रु	NPR	Paisa	100
Netherlands	Euro	€	EUR	Cent	100
New Caledonia	CFP franc	F	XPF	Centime	100
New Zealand	New Zealand dollar	$	NZD	Cent	100
Nicaragua	Nicaraguan córdoba	C$	NIO	Centavo	100
Niger	West African CFA franc	F.CFA	XOF	Centime	100
Nigeria	Nigerian naira	₦	NGN	Kobo	100
Niue	New Zealand dollar	$	NZD	Cent	100
Niue	Niue dollar	$	(none)	Cent	100
North Korea	North Korean won	₩	KPW	Chon	100
North Macedonia	Macedonian denar	DEN	MKD	Deni	100
Northern Cyprus	Turkish lira	₺	TRY	Kuruş	100
Norway	Norwegian krone	kr	NOK	Øre	100
Oman	Omani rial	⃄	OMR	Baisa	1000
Pakistan	Pakistani rupee	Re or Rs (pl.)	PKR	Paisa	100
Palau	United States dollar	$	USD	Cent	100
Palestine (Note: According to Article 4 of the 1994 Paris Protocol, the State of Palestine has no official currency. The Protocol allows the Palestinian Authority to adopt multiple currencies. In the West Bank, the Israeli new sheqel and Jordanian dinar are widely accepted, while in the Gaza Strip the Israeli new sheqel and Egyptian pound are widely accepted.)	Israeli new shekel	₪	ILS	Agora	100
Palestine	Egyptian pound	LE	EGP	Piastre	100
Palestine	Jordanian dinar	JD	JOD	Piastre	100
Panama	Panamanian balboa	B/	PAB	Centésimo	100
Panama	United States dollar	$	USD	Cent	100
Papua New Guinea	Papua New Guinean kina	K	PGK	Toea	100
Paraguay	Paraguayan guaraní	₲	PYG	Céntimo	100
Peru	Peruvian sol	S/	PEN	Céntimo	100
Philippines	Philippine peso	₱	PHP	Sentimo	100
Pitcairn Islands	New Zealand dollar	$	NZD	Cent	100
Pitcairn Islands	Pitcairn Islands dollar	$	(none)	Cent	100
Poland	Polish złoty	zł	PLN	Grosz	100
Portugal	Euro	€	EUR	Cent	100
Qatar	Qatari riyal	QR	QAR	Dirham	100
Romania	Romanian leu	Leu or Lei (pl.)	RON	Ban	100
Russia	Russian ruble	₽	RUB	Kopeck	100
Rwanda	Rwandan franc	FRw	RWF	Centime	100
Saba	United States dollar	$	USD	Cent	100
Sahrawi Republic (Note: Four currencies circulate in the partially recognized state of the Sahrawi Arab Democratic Republic, which claims the territory of Western Sahara. The Moroccan dirham is used in the Moroccan-administered part of the territory and the Sahrawi peseta is the commemorative currency of the Sahrawi Republic. Additionally, some de facto currencies circulate in the territory: the Algerian dinar is used in Sahrawi refugee camps in Tindouf and the Mauritanian ouguiya is used in Lagouira, which is under Mauritanian administration.)	Moroccan dirham	DH	MAD	Centime	100
Sahrawi Republic	Sahrawi peseta	Pta or Pts (pl.)	(none)	Centime	100
Saint Helena	Saint Helena pound	£	SHP	Penny	100
Saint Helena	Sterling	£	GBP	Penny	100
Saint Kitts and Nevis	Eastern Caribbean dollar	EC$	XCD	Cent	100
Saint Lucia	Eastern Caribbean dollar	EC$	XCD	Cent	100
Saint Vincent and the Grenadines	Eastern Caribbean dollar	EC$	XCD	Cent	100
Samoa	Samoan tālā	$	WST	Sene	100
San Marino	Euro	€	EUR	Cent	100
São Tomé and Príncipe	São Tomé and Príncipe dobra	Db	STN	Cêntimo	100
Saudi Arabia	Saudi riyal	⃁	SAR	Halala	100
Senegal	West African CFA franc	F.CFA	XOF	Centime	100
Serbia	Serbian dinar	DIN	RSD	Para	100
Seychelles	Seychellois rupee	Re or Rs (pl.)	SCR	Cent	100
Sierra Leone	Sierra Leonean leone	Le	SLE	Cent	100
Singapore (Note: The Singapore dollar is also accepted as customary tender in Brunei according to the Currency Interchangeability Agreement between the Monetary Authority of Singapore and the Autoriti Monetari Brunei Darussalam (Monetary Authority of Brunei Darussalam). Likewise, the Brunei dollar is also customarily accepted in Singapore.)	Singapore dollar	$	SGD	Cent	100
Singapore	Brunei dollar	$	BND	Sen	100
Sint Eustatius	United States dollar	$	USD	Cent	100
Sint Maarten	Caribbean guilder	Cg	XCG	Cent	100
Slovakia	Euro	€	EUR	Cent	100
Slovenia	Euro	€	EUR	Cent	100
Solomon Islands	Solomon Islands dollar	$	SBD	Cent	100
Somalia	Somali shilling	Sh or Shs (pl.)	SOS	Cent	100
Somaliland	Somaliland shilling	Sh or Shs (pl.)	(none)	Cent	100
South Africa	South African rand	R	ZAR	Cent	100
South Korea	South Korean won	₩	KRW	Jeon	100
South Ossetia	Russian ruble	₽	RUB	Kopeck	100
South Sudan	South Sudanese pound	SS£	SSP	Piaster	100
Spain	Euro	€	EUR	Cent	100
Sri Lanka	Sri Lankan rupee	Re or Rs (pl.)	LKR	Cent	100
Sudan	Sudanese pound	LS	SDG	Piastre	100
Suriname	Surinamese dollar	$	SRD	Cent	100
Sweden	Swedish krona	kr	SEK	Öre	100
Switzerland	Swiss franc	Fr	CHF	Rappen (Note: Rappen in German; centime in French; centesimo in Italian; rap in Romansh.)	100
Syria	Syrian pound	LS	SYP	Piastre	100
Taiwan	New Taiwan dollar	$	TWD	Cent	100
Tajikistan	Tajikistani somoni	SM	TJS	Diram	100
Tanzania	Tanzanian shilling	Sh or Shs (pl.)	TZS	Cent	100
Thailand	Thai baht	฿	THB	Satang	100
Timor-Leste	United States dollar	$	USD	Centavo	100
Togo	West African CFA franc	F.CFA	XOF	Centime	100
Tonga	Tongan paʻanga (Note: One hundred Tongan paʻanga equal one hau.)	T$	TOP	Seniti	100
Transnistria	Transnistrian ruble		(none)	Kopeck	100
Trinidad and Tobago	Trinidad and Tobago dollar	$	TTD	Cent	100
Tunisia	Tunisian dinar	DT	TND	Millime	1000
Turkey	Turkish lira	₺	TRY	Kuruş	100
Turkmenistan	Turkmenistani manat	m	TMT	Tenge	100
Turks and Caicos Islands	United States dollar	$	USD	Cent	100
Tuvalu	Tuvaluan dollar	$	(none)	Cent	100
Tuvalu	Australian dollar	$	AUD	Cent	100
Uganda	Ugandan shilling	Sh or Shs (pl.)	UGX	(none)	(none)
Ukraine	Ukrainian hryvnia	₴	UAH	Kopeck	100
United Arab Emirates	United Arab Emirates dirham	⃃	AED	Fils	100
United Kingdom	Sterling	£	GBP	Penny	100
United States	United States dollar	$	USD	Cent	100
Uruguay	Uruguayan peso	$	UYU	Centésimo	100
Uzbekistan	Uzbekistani sum	Sʻ	UZS	Tiyin	100
Vanuatu	Vanuatu vatu	VT	VUV	(none)	(none)
Vatican City	Euro	€	EUR	Cent	100
Venezuela	Venezuelan sovereign bolívar	Bs.S	VES	Céntimo	100
Venezuela	Venezuelan digital bolívar	Bs.D	VED	Céntimo	100
Vietnam	Vietnamese đồng	₫	VND	Hào (Note: One hào equals ten xu.)	10
Wallis and Futuna	CFP franc	F	XPF	Centime	100
Yemen	Yemeni rial	Rl or Rls (pl.)	YER	Fils	100
Zambia	Zambian kwacha	K	ZMW	Ngwee	100
Zimbabwe	Zimbabwe gold	ZiG	ZWG	(none)	(none)

== Currencies by number of countries/territories ==
Currency	Symbol or abbrev.	ISO code	Fractional unit		Countries/territories	
Currency	Symbol or abbrev.	ISO code	Name	No.	No.	Formal users
Euro	€	EUR	Cent	100	44	Akrotiri and Dhekelia, Andorra, Austria, Belgium, Bulgaria, Croatia, Cyprus, Estonia, Finland (Åland), France (French Guiana, French Southern and Antarctic Lands, Guadeloupe, Martinique, Mayotte, Réunion, Saint Barthélemy, Saint Martin, Saint Pierre and Miquelon), Germany, Greece (Mount Athos), Ireland, Italy, Kosovo, Latvia, Lithuania, Luxembourg, Malta, Monaco, Montenegro, Netherlands, Portugal (Azores, Madeira), San Marino, Slovakia, Slovenia, Spain (Canary Islands, Ceuta, Melilla), Vatican City
United States dollar	$	USD	Cent	100	19	United States (American Samoa, Guam, Northern Mariana Islands, Puerto Rico, United States Virgin Islands), Bonaire, British Virgin Islands, Ecuador, El Salvador, Liberia, Marshall Islands, Micronesia, Palau, Panama, Saba, Sint Eustatius, Timor-Leste, Turks and Caicos Islands
Pound sterling	£	GBP	Penny	100	11	United Kingdom (Bailiwick of Guernsey, Isle of Man, Jersey, British Indian Ocean Territory, Falkland Islands, Gibraltar, South Georgia and the South Sandwich Islands, Saint Helena, British Antarctic Territory, Tristan da Cunha)
Australian dollar	$	AUD	Cent	100	11	Australia (Ashmore and Cartier Islands, Australian Antarctic Territory, Christmas Island, Cocos Islands, Coral Sea Islands, Heard Island and McDonald Islands, Norfolk Island), Kiribati, Nauru, Tuvalu
Eastern Caribbean dollar	EC$	XCD	Cent	100	8	Anguilla, Antigua and Barbuda, Dominica, Grenada, Montserrat, Saint Kitts and Nevis, Saint Lucia, Saint Vincent and the Grenadines
West African CFA franc	Fr, F.CFA	XOF	Centime	100	8	Benin, Burkina Faso, Côte d'Ivoire, Guinea-Bissau, Mali, Niger, Senegal, Togo
New Zealand dollar	$	NZD	Cent	100	6	New Zealand (Cook Islands, Niue, Ross Dependency, Tokelau), Pitcairn Islands
Norwegian krone	kr	NOK	Øre	100	6	Norway (Bouvet Island, Jan Mayen, Peter I Island, Queen Maud Land, Svalbard)
Central African CFA franc	Fr, F.CFA	XAF	Centime	100	6	Cameroon, Central African Republic, Chad, Republic of the Congo, Equatorial Guinea, Gabon
South African rand	R	ZAR	Cent	100	4	South Africa, Eswatini, Lesotho, Namibia
CFP franc	F, or Fr	XPF	Centime	100	3	French Polynesia, New Caledonia, Wallis and Futuna
Chilean peso	$	CLP	Centavo	100	3	Chile (Chilean Antarctic Territory, Easter Island)
Danish krone	kr	DKK	Øre	100	3	Denmark (Faroe Islands, Greenland)
Indian rupee	₹	INR	Paisa	100	3	India, Bhutan, Nepal
Russian ruble	₽	RUB	Kopeck	100	3	Russia, Abkhazia, South Ossetia
Turkish lira	₺	TRY	Kuruş	100	2	Turkey, Northern Cyprus
Swiss franc	Fr	CHF	Rappen	100	2	Switzerland, Liechtenstein
Brunei dollar	B$	BND	Sen	100	2	Brunei, Singapore
Singapore dollar	$, S$	SGD	Cent	100	2	Singapore, Brunei
Caribbean guilder	ƒ or Cg	XCG	Cent	100	2	Curaçao, Sint Maarten
Saint Helena pound	£	SHP	Penny	100	2	Saint Helena, Ascension Island
Falkland Islands pound	£	FKP	Penny	100	2	Falkland Islands, South Georgia and the South Sandwich Islands

== See also ==
- List of currencies
- List of historical currencies
- Exchange rate
- List of countries by exchange rate regime
- Foreign exchange market
