= List of circulating fixed exchange rate currencies =

This is a list of circulating fixed exchange rate currencies, with corresponding reference currencies and exchange rates.

== List ==
Fixed currency (alphabetical order)	Anchor currency	Rate (anchor / fixed)
Abkhazian apsar (Note: The currency has limited recognition.)	Russian ruble	0.1
Alderney pound (only coins)	Pound sterling	1
Aruban florin	U.S. dollar	1.79
Azerbaijani manat	U.S. dollar	1.70
Bahamian dollar	U.S. dollar	1
Bahraini dinar	U.S. dollar	0.376
Barbadian dollar	U.S. dollar	2
Belize dollar	U.S. dollar	2
Bermudian dollar	U.S. dollar	1
Bhutanese ngultrum	Indian rupee	1
Bosnia and Herzegovina convertible mark	Euro	1.95583
Brunei dollar	Singapore dollar	1
Cape Verdean escudo	Euro	110.265
Caribbean guilder	U.S. dollar	1.79
Cayman Islands dollar	U.S. dollar	0.833333 (Note: The exact exchange rate is 1 KYD = 1.20 USD.)
CFA franc, Central African	Euro	655.957
CFA franc, West African	Euro	655.957
CFP franc	Euro	119.331742 (Note: The exact exchange rate is 1,000 XPF = 8.38 EUR.)
Comorian franc	Euro	491.96775
Cook Islands dollar	New Zealand dollar	1
Cuban peso	U.S. dollar	24 (Note: A second official exchange rate of 120 Cuban pesos per U.S. dollar exists.)
Djiboutian franc	U.S. dollar	177.721
Eastern Caribbean dollar	U.S. dollar	2.70
Ecuadorian centavo coins	U.S. dollar	1
Eritrean nakfa	U.S. dollar	15
Falkland Islands pound	Pound sterling	1
Faroese króna	Danish krone	1
Gibraltar pound	Pound sterling	1
Guernsey pound	Pound sterling	1
Jersey pound	Pound sterling	1
Jordanian dinar	U.S. dollar	0.709
Kiribati dollar	Australian dollar	1
Lebanese pound	U.S. dollar	15,000 (official rate); 89,500 (sayrafa rate)
Lesotho loti	South African rand	1
Macanese pataca	Hong Kong dollar	1.03
Manx pound	Pound sterling	1
Namibian dollar	South African rand	1
Nepalese rupee	Indian rupee	1.6
Niue dollar	New Zealand dollar	1
Omani rial	U.S. dollar	0.384497 (Note: The exact exchange rate is 1 OMN = 2.6008 USD.)
Panamanian balboa	U.S. dollar	1
Pitcairn Islands dollar	New Zealand dollar	1
Qatari riyal	U.S. dollar	3.64
Saint Helena pound	Pound sterling	1
São Tomé and Príncipe dobra	Euro	24.50
Saudi riyal	U.S. dollar	3.75
South Ossetian Zarin	Russian ruble	10
Swazi lilangeni	South African rand	1
Timor-Leste centavo coins	U.S. dollar	1
Turkmenistan manat	U.S. dollar	3.5
Tuvaluan dollar	Australian dollar	1
United Arab Emirates dirham	U.S. dollar	3.6725

== See also ==
- Fixed exchange rate system
- List of circulating currencies
