= List of currencies used in dependent territories =

A dependent territory, dependent area, or dependency is a territory that does not possess full political independence or sovereignty as a sovereign state, yet remains politically outside the controlling state's integral area. Most use the currency of their administrating country; this List of currencies used in dependent territory details their use of currency. Most of these banknotes are pledged with their parent currencies (i.e. Gibraltar pound is pledged with Pound Starling).

== List of currencies used in dependent territory ==
List of currencies used in dependent territory
Present currency	Country or dependency (administrating country)	Currency sign	Fractional unit	Ref(s)
Aruban florin	Aruba (Kingdom of the Netherlands)	Afl	cent	
Australian dollar	Christmas Island (Australia)	$	Cent	
Australian dollar	Cocos (Keeling) Islands (Australia)	$	Cent	
Australian dollar	Norfolk Island (Australia)	$	Cent	
Bermudian dollar	Bermuda (United Kingdom)	$	Cent	
CFP franc	French Polynesia (France)	F		
CFP franc	New Caledonia (France)	F		
CFP franc	Wallis and Futuna (France)	F		
Cook Islands dollar	Cook Islands (Realm of New Zealand)	$	Cent	
Cayman Islands dollar	Cayman Islands (United Kingdom)	$	Cent	
Danish krone	Greenland (Denmark)	kr	Øre	
East Caribbean dollar	Anguilla (United Kingdom)	$	Cent	
East Caribbean dollar	Montserrat (United Kingdom)	$	Cent	
Euro	Åland Islands (Finland)	€	Cent	
Euro	Akrotiri and Dhekelia (United Kingdom)	€	Cent	
Euro	Guadeloupe (France)	€	Cent	
Euro	Martinique (France)	€	Cent	
Euro	Saint Barthélemy (France)	€	Cent	
Euro	Saint Martin (France)	€	Cent	
Euro	Saint Pierre and Miquelon (France)	€	Cent	
Euro	French Guiana (France)	€	Cent	
Falkland Islands pound	Falkland Islands (United Kingdom)	£	Pence	
Faroese króna	Faroe Islands (Denmark)	kr	oyru(r)	
Gibraltar Pound	Gibraltar (United Kingdom)	£	Penny	
Guernsey Pound	Bailiwick of Guernsey	£	Penny	
Hong Kong dollar	Hong Kong	$	Cent	
Jersey Pound	Bailiwick of Jersey	£	Penny	
Macanese pataca	Macau	MOP$	ho (Chinese) dez avos (Portuguese)	
Manx Pound	Isle of Man	£	Penny	
Caribbean guilder	Curaçao (Kingdom of the Netherlands)	Cg	Cent	
Caribbean guilder	Sint Maarten (Kingdom of the Netherlands)	Cg	Cent	
New Zealand dollar	Cook Islands (Realm of New Zealand)	$	Cent	
New Zealand dollar	Niue (Realm of New Zealand)	$	Cent	
New Zealand dollar	Tokelau (Realm of New Zealand)	$	Cent	
New Zealand dollar	Pitcairn Islands (United Kingdom)	$	Cent	
New Zealand dollar	Ross Dependency (Realm of New Zealand)	$	Cent	
Norwegian krone	Svalbard (Norway)	kr	øre	
Saint Helena pound	Saint Helena	£	Penny	
United Kingdom pound	South Georgia and the South Sandwich Islands (United Kingdom)	£	Pence	
United States dollar	Bonaire (Netherlands)	$	Cent	
United States dollar	British Virgin Islands (United Kingdom)	$	Cent	
United States dollar	Guam (United States)	$	Cent	
United States dollar	Northern Mariana Islands (United States)	$	Cent	
United States dollar	Puerto Rico (United States)	$	Cent	
United States dollar	Saba (Netherlands)	$	Cent	
United States dollar	Sint Eustatius (Netherlands)	$	Cent	
United States dollar	Turks and Caicos Islands (United Kingdom)	$	Cent	
United States dollar	United States Virgin Islands (United States)	$	Cent	
United States dollar	American Samoa (United States)	$	Cent	
