= Platinum coins of Russia =

Platinum coins of Russia may refer to:

- Platinum coins of the Russian Empire (minted 1828-1845)
- Platinum coins of the Soviet Union (minted 1980, 1988-1991)
- Platinum coins of the Russian Federation (minted 1992-1996)
