= Niue dollar =

Currency used in Niue

Dollar

ISO 4217
- Code: NZD (numeric: 554)
- Subunit: 0.01

Unit
- Symbol: $

Denominations
- Subunit
- 1/100: cent
- Symbol
- cent: c
- Banknotes: $5, $10, $20, $50, $100 (New Zealand notes only)
- Coins: 10c, 20c, 50c, $1, $2 (New Zealand coins only)

Demographics
- User(s): Niue

Issuance
- Central bank: Reserve Bank of New Zealand
- Website: www.rbnz.govt.nz
- Printer: Note Printing Australia (provides base polymer note material)
- Website: www.noteprinting.com
- Mint: New Zealand Mint
- Website: www.newzealandmint.com

Niue, a country in free association with New Zealand, uses only one official legal tender currency, which is the New Zealand dollar.

Before the creation of the New Zealand dollar in 1967, Niue was a user of the New Zealand pound and its very early commemorative coins of Niue were in pound or shilling increments.

Niue first began issuing coins in 1966. These have been mostly bullion and non-circulating base metal commemorative issues. They are acceptable as legal tender within Niue, though unlikely to be found anywhere on the island.

== Coins ==
In 2009, Niue began issuing its first standardised coin set in denominations of 5, 10, 20, 50 cents and 1 Dollar; they are thicker than New Zealand coins as well as having a different metallic composition. They are also of the same exact size and composition as the Pitcairn Islands special coin set.

All of the standard set coins bear images relevant to the country, surrounded by a distinct border.

All coins of Niue depict the national crest or an official effigy of the reigning British monarch on the obverse.

In 2011, the New Zealand Mint produced a limited edition set of New Zealand Dollar legal tender coins, as an official issue of Niue commemorating the Star Wars motion picture series, authorised by Lucasfilm Ltd., and depicting many principal characters from the series rendered in colour.

== See also ==
- Cook Islands dollar
- New Zealand dollar
- Pitcairn Islands dollar
