= Stuiver (1948) =

5 cents
- Netherlands
- Value: 0.05 Dutch guilder
- Mass: 3.5 g
- Diameter: 17 mm
- Thickness: ? mm
- Edge: smooth
- Composition: 95% Cu, 4% tin, 1% Zn (Bronze)
- Years of minting: 1948
- Mintage: 51,000,000 (Utrecht)
- Circulation: ? – 28 January 2002; Redeemed by national bank until 1 January 2007

Obverse
- Design: Face value, year
- Designer: L. O. Wenckebach

Reverse
- Design: Portrait of Queen Wilhelmina. Country-designation.
- Designer: L. O. Wenckebach

The respective total mintage of the Stuiver 1948 was: 25,000,000, struck in Utrecht by the Utrecht mint, mintmaster.

Preceded by World War II; 1941-1943	5 cent coins 1948	Succeeded by 5 cents Juliana; 1950–1980
