= Band of fluctuation =

Foreign exchange market

The band of fluctuation is the range within which the market value of a national currency is permitted to fluctuate by international agreements, or by unilateral decision by the central bank.

== History ==
The IMF created a fixed exchange rate system for the first time in July 1944, in which its members agreed on administratively fixed US dollar currency parities and/or gold parities. The US $ currency parity indicated how many units of a foreign currency were equivalent to one US dollar. The gold parities and/or US $ parities were used to calculate the parities of the other currencies. This created a system of fixed exchange rates between the member countries. In May 1949, the IMF set the first exchange rate parity at 1 US $ = 3.33 DM; by September 1949, the IMF parity was already at 4.20 DM due to the devaluation of the DM. In March 1961, it fell to DM 4.00 due to the first revaluation of the DM, followed by the second DM revaluation in October 1969 to DM 3.66 and a third in December 1969 to DM 3.22.

== See also ==
- Fixed exchange rate system
- List of circulating fixed exchange rate currencies
- Linked exchange rate system in Hong Kong
- Managed float regime
