= Platinum coins of the Russian Federation =

The Russian Federation issued 16 platinum coins starting from 1992, with the face value of 25 (weighing 1/10 oz), 50 (1/4 oz) and 150 rubles (1/2 oz). Minting was suspended in 1996, with the last coin of 150 rubles dedicated to the 1240 Battle of the Neva.

== Coins ==
Series: The Age of Enlightenment. 18th Century. Battle of Chesma
Date	Catalogue #	Value	Grading	Purity	Total weight, g	Platinum contents, at least, g	Diameter, mm	Thickness, mm	# pcs.
24 November 1992	5318-0001	150 rubles	Proof	999/1000	15.67 (± 0.11)	15.55	28.60 (−0.25)	1.5 (± 0.2)	3000
Obverse: two-headed eagle (designed by I. Bilibin), bottom – BANK OF RUSSIA. At the bottom – the designation of metal, alloy, the precious metal content and the mint trademark. Reverse: three sailing ships and a boat at the Battle of Chesma, around: "Age of Enlightenment. 18th century.", bottom: "Battle of Chesma" Design: A.V. Baklanov Mint: Leningrad Mint (LMD). 240 indents on the rim.									
Series: The Olympic Century Russia. First participation of Russia in the Olympics
Date	Catalogue #	Value	Grading	Purity	Total weight, g	Platinum contents, at least, g	Diameter, mm	Thickness, mm	# pcs.
20 January 1993	5316-0001	50 rubles	Proof	999/1000	7.88 (± 0.09)	7.78	20.0 (−0.15)	1.60 (± 0.15)	7500
Obverse: center – the emblem of the Bank of Russia (two-headed eagle designed by I. Bilibin), bottom – symbol, purity and weight of platinum, "BANK OF RUSSIA" Reverse: two horse riders – Russian participants of the II Olympic Games, right – the Eiffel Tower, left – the emblem of the Russian Olympic Committee, around: "OLYMPIC AGE OF RUSSIA, FIRST PARTICIPANCE · PARIS" Design: A.V. Baklanov (obverse), N.A. Nosov (reverse) Mint: Leningrad Mint (LMD). 134 indents on the rim.									
Series: Russian Ballet (25 rubles)
Date	Catalogue #	Value	Grading	Purity	Total weight, g	Platinum contents, at least, g	Diameter, mm	Thickness, mm	# pcs.
19 April 1993	5315-0001	25 rubles	Proof	999/1000	3.198 (± 0.08)	3.11	16.0 (−0.1)	1.00 (± 0.15)	750
Obverse: center – the emblem of the Bank of Russia (two-headed eagle designed by I. Bilibin), bottom – symbol, purity and weight of platinum, "BANK OF RUSSIA" Reverse: a dancing ballerina, around it: "RUSSIAN BALLET" Design: A.V. Baklanov Mint: Leningrad Mint (LMD). 111 indents on the rim.									
Series: Russian Ballet (50 rubles)
Date	Catalogue #	Value	Grading	Purity	Total weight, g	Platinum contents, at least, g	Diameter, mm	Thickness, mm	# pcs.
19 April 1993	5316-0002	50 rubles	Proof	999/1000	7.88 (± 0.09)	7.78	20.0 (−0.15)	1.60 (± 0.15)	750
Obverse: center – the emblem of the Bank of Russia (two-headed eagle designed by I. Bilibin), bottom – symbol, purity and weight of platinum, "BANK OF RUSSIA" Reverse: a dancing ballerina, around it: "RUSSIAN BALLET" Design: A.V. Baklanov Mint: Leningrad Mint (LMD) 134 indents on the rim.									
Series: Russian Ballet (150 rubles)
Date	Catalogue #	Value	Grading	Purity	Total weight, g	Platinum contents, at least, g	Diameter, mm	Thickness, mm	# pcs.
19 April 1993	5318-0002	150 rubles	Proof	999/1000	15.67 (± 0.11)	15.55	22.60 (−0.25)	1.5 (± 0.2)	750
Obverse: center – the emblem of the Bank of Russia (two-headed eagle designed by I. Bilibin), bottom – symbol, purity and weight of platinum, "BANK OF RUSSIA" Reverse: a dancing ballerina, around it: "RUSSIAN BALLET" Design: A.V. Baklanov Mint: Leningrad Mint (LMD) 240 indents on the rim.									
Geographical Series: The first Russian voyage around the world. English Embankment in St. Petersburg
Date	Catalogue #	Value	Grading	Purity	Total weight, g	Platinum contents, at least, g	Diameter, mm	Thickness, mm	# pcs.
28 April 1993	5318-0003	150 rubles	Proof	999/1000	15.67 (± 0.11)	15.55	28.60 (−0.25)	1.5 (± 0.2)	2500
Obverse: center – the emblem of the Bank of Russia (two-headed eagle designed by I. Bilibin), bottom – symbol, purity and weight of platinum, "BANK OF RUSSIA" Reverse: ships Nadezhda and Neva and two boats. Background – houses of Russia's State Chancellor Count N.P. Rumyantsev in St. Petersburg on the English Embankment of the Neva River. Around it: "The first Russian voyage around the world 1803 • 1806" "English Embankment" Design: A.V. Baklanov Mint: Leningrad Mint (LMD). 240 indents on the rim.									
Historical Series: Russia's Contribution to World Culture. I. Stravinsky
Date	Catalogue #	Value	Grading	Purity	Total weight, g	Platinum contents, at least, g	Diameter, mm	Thickness, mm	# pcs.
13 December 1993	5318-0004	150 rubles	Proof	999/1000	15.67 (± 0.11)	15.55	28.60 (−0.25)	1.5 (± 0.2)	3000
Obverse: center – the emblem of the Bank of Russia (two-headed eagle designed by I. Bilibin), bottom – symbol, purity and weight of platinum, "BANK OF RUSSIA" Reverse: the image of Igor Stravinsky, background – a scene from the ballet "Petrushka", left – a lyre and a laurel branch, around: "RUSSIA AND WORLD CULTURE", "I. Stravinsky" Design: A.V. Baklanov Mint: Leningrad Mint (LMD) 240 indents on the rim.									
Series: Russian Ballet (25 rubles, 1994)
Date	Catalogue #	Value	Grading	Purity	Total weight, g	Platinum contents, at least, g	Diameter, mm	Thickness, mm	# pcs.
07.06.1994	5315-0002	25 rubles	Proof	999/1000	3.198 (± 0.08)	3.11	16.0 (−0.1)	1.00 (± 0.15)	900
Obverse: two-headed eagle (designed by I. Bilibin), bottom – symbol, purity and weight of platinum, "BANK OF RUSSIA" Reverse: a dancing ballerina, around it: "RUSSIAN BALLET" Design: A.V. Baklanov Mint: Leningrad Mint (LMD) 111 indents on the rim.									
Series: Russian Ballet (50 rubles, 1994)
Date	Catalogue #	Value	Grading	Purity	Total weight, g	Platinum contents, at least, g	Diameter, mm	Thickness, mm	# pcs.
07.06.1994	5316-0003	50 rubles	Proof	999/1000	7.88 (± 0.09)	7.78	20.0 (−0.15)	1.60 (± 0.15)	900
Obverse: two-headed eagle (designed by I. Bilibin), bottom – symbol, purity and weight of platinum, "BANK OF RUSSIA" Reverse: a dancing ballerina, around it: "RUSSIAN BALLET" Design: A.V. Baklanov Mint: Leningrad Mint (LMD) 134 indents on the rim.									
Series: Russian Ballet (150 rubles, 1994)
Date	Catalogue #	Value	Grading	Purity	Total weight, g	Platinum contents, at least, g	Diameter, mm	Thickness, mm	# pcs.
07.06.1994	5318-0005	150 rubles	Proof	999/1000	15.67 (± 0.11)	15.55	28.6 (−0.25)	1.5 (± 0.2)	900
Obverse: two-headed eagle (designed by I. Bilibin), bottom – symbol, purity and weight of platinum, "BANK OF RUSSIA" Reverse: a dancing ballerina, around it: "RUSSIAN BALLET" Design: A.V. Baklanov Mint: Leningrad Mint (LMD). 240 indents on the rim.									
Geographical Series: First Russian Antarctic Expedition
Date	Catalogue #	Value	Grading	Purity	Total weight, g	Platinum contents, at least, g	Diameter, mm	Thickness, mm	# pcs.
06.09.1994	5318-0006	150 rubles	Proof	999/1000	15.67 (± 0.11)	15.55	28.6 (−0.25)	1.5 (± 0.2)	4000
Obverse: two-headed eagle (designed by I. Bilibin), bottom – symbol, purity and weight of platinum, "BANK OF RUSSIA" Reverse: ships Vostok and Mirny, under them – a boat with rowers, penguins on an ice floe, around: "FIRST RUSSIAN ANTARCTIC EXPEDITION 1819–1821", "in Antarctic waters" Design: A.V. Baklanov Mint: Leningrad Mint (LMD) 240 indents on the rim.									
Historical Series: Russia's Contribution to World Culture. Mikhail Vrubel
Date	Catalogue #	Value	Grading	Purity	Total weight, g	Platinum contents, at least, g	Diameter, mm	Thickness, mm	# pcs.
17 November 1994	5318-0007	150 rubles	Proof	999/1000	15.67 (± 0.11)	15.55	28.6 (−0.25)	1.5 (± 0.2)	3000
Obverse: two-headed eagle (designed by I. Bilibin), bottom – symbol, purity and weight of platinum, "BANK OF RUSSIA" Reverse: self-portrait of Mikhail Vrubel, below – a palette and brushes, to the right – a fragment of his painting Demon Seated in a Garden, around: "RUSSIA AND WORLD CULTURE", "M. Vrubel" Design: A.V. Baklanov Mint: Leningrad Mint (LMD). 240 indents on the rim.									
Series: Russian Ballet. Sleeping Beauty (25 rubles)
Date	Catalogue #	Value	Grading	Purity	Total weight, g	Platinum contents, at least, g	Diameter, mm	Thickness, mm	# pcs.
16 June 1995	5315-0003	25 rubles	Proof	999/1000	3.198 (± 0.08)	3.11	16.0 (−0.1)	1.00 (± 0.15)	900
Obverse: center – the emblem of the Bank of Russia (two-headed eagle designed by I. Bilibin), bottom – symbol, purity and weight of platinum, "BANK OF RUSSIA" Reverse: in the center – a dancer, left to right in a circle – the inscription: "Sleeping Beauty". Design: A.V. Baklanov Mint: Saint Petersburg Mint (LMD) 111 indents on the rim.									
Series: Russian Ballet. Sleeping Beauty (50 rubles)
Date	Catalogue #	Value	Grading	Purity	Total weight, g	Platinum contents, at least, g	Diameter, mm	Thickness, mm	# pcs.
16 June 1995	5316-0004	50 rubles	Proof	999/1000	7.88 (± 0.09)	7.78	20.0 (−0.15)	1.60 (± 0.15)	900
Obverse: center – the emblem of the Bank of Russia (two-headed eagle designed by I. Bilibin), bottom – symbol, purity and weight of platinum, "BANK OF RUSSIA" Reverse: a dancer, around him: "Sleeping Beauty" Design: A.V. Baklanov Mint: Saint Petersburg Mint (LMD) 134 indents on the rim.									
Series: Russian Ballet. Sleeping Beauty (150 rubles)
Date	Catalogue #	Value	Grading	Purity	Total weight, g	Platinum contents, at least, g	Diameter, mm	Thickness, mm	# pcs.
16 June 1995	5318-0008	150 rubles	Proof	999/1000	15.67 (± 0.11)	15.55	22.60 (−0.25)	1.5 (± 0.2)	900
Obverse: center – the emblem of the Bank of Russia (two-headed eagle designed by I. Bilibin), bottom – symbol, purity and weight of platinum, "BANK OF RUSSIA" Reverse: a dancer, around him: "Sleeping Beauty" Design: A.V. Baklanov Mint: Saint Petersburg Mint (LMD) 134 indents on the rim.									
Historical Series: 1000 years of Russia. Alexander Nevsky
Date	Catalogue #	Value	Grading	Purity	Total weight, g	Platinum contents, at least, g	Diameter, mm	Thickness, mm	# pcs.
28 December 1995	5318-0009	150 rubles	Proof	999/1000	15.55 (± 0.09)	15.5	28.6 (−0.25)	1.5 (± 0.2)	3000
Obverse: center – the emblem of the Bank of Russia (two-headed eagle designed by I. Bilibin), bottom – symbol, purity and weight of platinum, "BANK OF RUSSIA" Reverse: a fight between four Russian soldiers and a Swedish knight, around: "1000 YEARS OF RUSSIA · Alexander Nevsky", "BATTLE AT THE RIVER NEVA 1240" Design: A.V. Baklanov Mint: Saint Petersburg Mint (LMD). 240 indents on the rim.									

== See also ==
- Platinum coins of the Russian Empire
- Platinum coins of the Soviet Union
