= Twenty-five øre (Danish coin) =

Denomination of the Danish krone

- Kingdom of Denmark Denmark Faroe Islands Greenland
- Value: 0.25 Danish Krone
- Mass: 2.8 g
- Diameter: 17.5 mm
- Thickness: 1.55 mm
- Edge: Smooth
- Orientation: Medallic
- Composition: 97% Copper, 2.5% Zinc & 0.5% Tin
- Years of minting: 1874–2008
- Circulation: 29 January 1991 – 1 October 2008

Obverse
- Design: Face value, mint mark
- Designer: N/A

Reverse
- Design: Country-designation. Crown, year of minting
- Designer: N/A

The twenty-five øre coin was a coin of the Danish krone. It was the lowest-denomination coin in the country when it was demonetised on 1 October 2008.

== History ==
=== Silver coin ===
The denomination was first introduced on the decimalisation of the currency in 1874 as a 0.600 silver coin. It measured 17mm in diameter and 1.3mm in thickness, weighing 2.42g. Its obverse featured the portrait of King Christian IX and the script KONGE AF DANMARK (King of Denmark). The reverse featured the denomination and two dolphins. The last minting of this coin was 1905.

The second silver twenty-five øre coin had its first issue in 1907, to the same specifications of the previous version. It featured the portrait of King Frederick VIII as well as thicker writing on his script, which now read DANMARKS KONGE (Denmark's king). The reverse featured a fleur-de-lis pattern circling the outside. Its only other strike was in 1911.

The next twenty-five øre coin, first issued in 1913, was the first not to feature the portrait of the monarch. Its obverse contained the monogram of King Christian X, with his crown atop. The reverse was now plainer, without the fleur-de-lis pattern. From 1920 to its last issue in 1922, the coin was made from cupro-nickel and not silver, which decreased its mass to 2.4g. The dimensions remained the same as since 1874.

=== Cupro-nickel coin ===
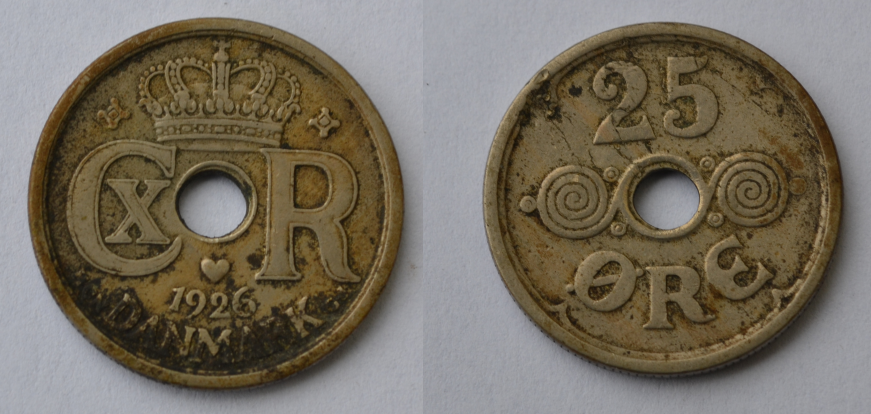
1926 twenty-five øre coin

In 1924, the coin's diameter increased to 23mm, its weight to 4.5g and its thickness to 1.5mm. A hole was introduced through the centre. An R (for rex, Latin for King) was placed on the obverse to the other side of the hole from the monogram. This coin was struck until 1947, although issues from 1941 to 1945 were made from zinc due to a shortage of valuable materials during the Second World War, and thus weighed less, at 3.6g.

In 1948, the obverse was changed to the monogram of King Frederik IX. The hole was removed and the reverse denomination written in plainer type, yet the dimensions remained the same. In 1960, the wreath around the monogram was transferred to the reverse. The hole returned in 1966, bringing the weight down to 4.23g. Half of a beech wreath was placed on the right side of the hole on the obverse with the monogram on the left. Barley featured on the reverse.

In 1973, the monogram of Queen Margrethe II first appeared on the coin. The half wreath became an oak sprig and the reverse became stylised.

=== Bronze coin ===
The last twenty-five øre coin was first struck in 1990. Its composition changed from cupro-nickel to an alloy of copper, zinc and tin. No portrait or monogram featured, only the crown of Christian V of Denmark on the obverse. Due to the decreasing value of the coin, it was abolished as a legal tender as of 1 October 2008. Its exchange for circulating coins was removed on 1 October 2011. Despite the changes in alloy and design of twenty-five øre coins from 1874 to 2009, all were full legal tender until the demonetisation of the currency, although the bullion value of the silver coins would far exceed their face value.

== Design ==
The crown was placed in the centre of the obverse of the coin. The sovereign's crown is the most important Royal and State symbol and represented national sovereignty. Since 1671 the crown of Christian V of Denmark, which is kept at Rosenborg Castle, has been the Royal Danish crown. The year of minting is seen at the top of the coin. On the reverse of the coin the figure "25" is placed in the centre. Above, the heart of the Royal Mint is embossed. The use of the heart is a century-old tradition, originally indicating the mint master, later the place of minting. Today, the mint mark serves no practical purpose since Danish coins are minted in only one place.
