= Platinum coins of the Soviet Union =

The Soviet Union minted a series of commemorative platinum coins from 1977 to 1991.

Eleven commemorative platinum coins with a 150-ruble face value were minted, some as part of a series commemorating the 1980 Summer Olympics. The price for proof platinum coins of the USSR typically exceeds $1,500 per coin.

== 1980 Olympics commemorative issue ==
The following coins forms part of the commemorative coin series minted for the 1980 Summer Olympics in Moscow, along with cupronickel coins, silver 5 and 10 rubles, and gold 100 ruble coins.

These "XXII Summer Olympic Games" platinum coins depicted the emblem of the Olympics and fragments of the ancient Olympic Games, and were issued in the period 1977–1980 in the two versions, proof and uncirculated. The proof minting technique (coins with mirrored background and frosted image) was first introduced in the Soviet Union in 1977 specifically for the Olympic commemorative series, and its quality (especially of the snow-like images) has been praised by experts.

Olympics-1980: Emblem of the games
| Year | Value | Grading | Purity | Weight, g | Diameter, mm | # (proof), pcs. (Note: Circulation values differ from source to source) | # (uncirculated), pcs. | Obverse | Reverse |
| 1977 | 150 rubles | Proof/AC | 999/1000 | 15.57 | 28.6 | 24,160 | 9,910 | Obverse | Reverse |
| Obverse: Coat of Arms of the USSR and the face value Reverse: Emblem of the XXII Olympic Games with a laurel wreath. Bottom – minting year, left – trade mark of the mint, along the rim: "The Games of the XXII Olympiad. MOSCOW. 1980" Design: Ermakov Mint: Leningrad Mint (LMD). | | | | | | | | | |
Olympics-80: Discus Thrower
| Year | Value | Grading | Purity | Weight, g | Diameter, mm | # (proof), pcs. | # (uncirculated), pcs. | Obverse | Reverse |
| 1978 | 150 rubles | Proof/AC | 999/1000 | 15.57 | 28.6 | 19,853 | 13,403 | Obverse | Reverse |
| Obverse: Coat of Arms of the USSR and the face value Reverse: Discus thrower, below – the mint trademark and the minting year, right – emblem of the games, along the rim: "The Games of the XXII Olympiad. MOSCOW. 1980" Design: Ermakov Mint: Leningrad Mint (LMD). | | | | | | | | | |
Olympics-80: Champions
| Year | Value | Grading | Purity | Weight, g | Diameter, mm | # (proof), pcs. | # (uncirculated), pcs. | Obverse | Reverse |
| 1979 | 150 rubles | Proof/AC | 999/1000 | 15.57 | 28.6 | 13,578 | 18,978 | Obverse | Reverse |
| Obverse: Coat of Arms of the USSR and the face value Reverse: Two wrestlers on the backdrop of ancient columns. Between the columns – the emblem of games, under the left column – the trade mark of the mint, bottom – the minting year, along the rim: "The Games of the XXII Olympiad. MOSCOW. 1980" Design: Ermakov Mint: Leningrad Mint (LMD). | | | | | | | | | |
Olympics-80: Quadriga
| Year | Value | Grading | Purity | Weight, g | Diameter, mm | Circulation (proof), pc. | # (uncirculated), pcs. | Obverse | Reverse |
| 1979 | 150 rubles | Proof/AC | 999/1000 | 15.57 | 28.6 | 17,078 | 9,728 | Obverse | Reverse |
| Obverse: Coat of Arms of the USSR and the face value Reverse: Two chariots, left – the emblem of games, bottom – the mint trademark and the minting year, along the rim: "The Games of the XXII Olympiad. MOSCOW. 1980" Design: Ermakov Mint: Leningrad Mint (LMD). | | | | | | | | | |
Olympics-80: Runners
| Year | Value | Grading | Purity | Weight, g | Diameter, mm | Circulation (proof), pc. | # (uncirculated), pcs. | Obverse | Reverse |
| 1980 | 150 rubles | Proof/AC | 999/1000 | 15.57 | 28.6 | 12,870 | 7,820 | Obverse | Reverse |
| Obverse: Coat of Arms of the USSR and the face value Reverse: Two ancient runners, right – the emblem of games, bottom – the mint trademark and the minting year, along the rim: "The Games of the XXII Olympiad. MOSCOW. 1980" Design: Ermakov Mint: Leningrad Mint (LMD). | | | | | | | | | |

== Other designs (1988-1991) ==
Although the Soviet Union issued commemorative platinum coins every year since 1977, designs unrelated to the Olympics appeared only in 1988 with the series "1000 years of ancient coinage, literature, architecture and the Baptism of Russia", along with silver, gold, platinum, and palladium coins. The series marked the first time palladium was used in minting coins. This series was highly praised internationally and awarded the first prize for the quality of minting at the 1988 numismatic exhibition in Basel.

Series: 1000 years of coinage, literature, architecture, and the Baptism of Russia. The Tale of Igor's Campaign
| Year | Value | Grading | Purity | Weight, g | Diameter, mm | # pcs. (Note: Platinum Coins 1988–1991, the USSR issued only with the quality of proof. Circulation in the different cost sources. The figures, which called into question in italics.) | Obverse | Reverse |
| 1988 | 150 rubles | Proof | 999/1000 | 15.57 | 28.6 | 16,000 | Obverse | Reverse |
| Obverse: Coat of Arms of the USSR and the face value Reverse: A scribe at work with cavalry troops in the background. Bottom: "The Tale of Igor's Campaign · 1185", along the rim: "1000 years of ancient literature" Design: A.V. Baklanov Mint: Leningrad Mint (LMD). | | | | | | | | |
Series: 500 years of united Russian state. Standing on the Ugra
| Year | Value | Grading | Purity | Weight, g | Diameter, mm | # pcs. | Obverse | Reverse |
| 1989 | 150 rubles | Proof | 999/1000 | 15.57 | 28.6 | 16,000 | Obverse | Reverse |
| Obverse: Coat of Arms of the USSR and the face value Reverse: Two cavalry forces facing each other with the river between them, around the image: "500 years of united Russian state", bottom: "Standing on the Ugra · 1480" Design: A.V. Baklanov Mint: Leningrad Mint (LMD). | | | | | | | | |
Series: 500 years of united Russian state. Battle of Poltava
| Year | Value | Grading | Purity | Weight, g | Diameter, mm | # pcs. | Obverse | Reverse |
| 1990 | 150 rubles | Proof | 999/1000 | 15.57 | 28.6 | 16,000 | Obverse | Reverse |
| Obverse: Coat of Arms of the USSR and the face value Reverse: Russian cavalry charging at the Swedish troops, around the image: "500 years of united Russia", bottom: "Battle of Poltava 1709" Design: A.V. Baklanov Mint: Leningrad Mint (LMD). | | | | | | | | |
Series: 250 years of discovery of Russian America. St. Gabriel
| Year | Value | Grading | Purity | Weight, g | Diameter, mm | # pcs. | Obverse | Reverse |
| 1990 | 150 rubles | Proof | 999/1000 | 15.57 | 28.6 | 6,500 | Obverse | Reverse |
| Obverse: Coat of Arms of the USSR and the face value Reverse: Sailing boat in wavy sea, around: "250 years of the discovery of Russian America", bottom: "BOT St. GAVRIIL/M. GVOZDEV – 1732", divided decorative element. Design: A.V. Baklanov Mint: Leningrad Mint (LMD). | | | | | | | | |
Series: 500 years of united Russia. War of 1812
| Year | Value | Grading | Purity | Weight, g | Diameter, mm | # pcs. | Obverse | Reverse |
| 1991 | 150 rubles | Proof | 999/1000 | 15.57 | 28.6 | 16,000 | Obverse | Reverse |
| Obverse: Coat of Arms of the USSR and the face value Reverse: An obelisk with an angel holding a cross, left – portrait of Napoleon, right – portrait of Alexander I (with names under both portraits), around the image: "500 YEARS OF UNITED RUSSIA", below: "PATRIOTIC WAR OF 1812." Design: A.V. Baklanov Mint: Leningrad Mint (LMD). | | | | | | | | |
Series: 250-anniversary of the discovery of Russian America. John Benjamin
| Year | Value | Grading | Purity | Weight, g | Diameter, mm | # pcs. | Obverse | Reverse |
| 1991 | 150 rubles | Proof | 999/1000 | 15.57 | 28.6 | 6,500 | Obverse | Reverse |
| Obverse: Coat of Arms of the USSR and the face value Reverse: The image of Ivan Veniaminov, in monk's dress, holding a cross, with a sailing boat in the background. Around it: "250 years of the discovery of Russian America", below: "Ivan Veniaminov – missionary and educator" Design: A.V. Baklanov Mint: Leningrad Mint (LMD). | | | | | | | | |

== See also ==
- List of commemorative coins of the Soviet Union
- Platinum coins of the Russian Empire
- Platinum coins of the Russian Federation
