= Krone (Danish coin) =

Currency

krone
- Kingdom of Denmark Denmark Faroe Islands Greenland
- Value: 1.00 Danish krone
- Mass: 3.6 g
- Diameter: 20.25 mm
- Thickness: 1.60 mm
- Edge: Milled
- Composition: Cupronickel (75% Cu, 25% Ni)
- Years of minting: 1875 – present

Obverse
- Design: Face value, mint mark
- Designer: Jeanette Skov Jensen

Reverse
- Design: Monogram of Frederik X
- Designer: Jeanette Skov Jensen

The krone coin is the second-smallest denomination of the Danish krone.

== History ==
=== Silver coin ===
The first krone coin was a 0.800 silver coin issued in 1875. It measured 25 millimetres (0.98 in) in diameter and weighed 7.5 grams (0.26 oz). The coin featured King Christian IX of Denmark on its obverse, with the inscription KONGE AF DANMARK (King of Denmark). The reverse featured the coat of arms of Denmark with the denomination written underneath. The coin was minted in the years 1875, 1876, 1892, and 1898.

A second silver krone was minted in 1915 and 1916, with King Christian X of Denmark on the obverse. It was struck to the same specifications as the previous coin.

=== Aluminium-bronze coin ===
In 1924, an aluminium-bronze krone featuring the crowned monogram of Christian X on the obverse and the crown again on the reverse was introduced, and it was issued until 1941. It measured 25.5 millimetres (1.00 in) in diameter and 1.8 mm in thickness, and weighed 6.5 grams (0.23 oz).

In 1942 the portrait of the King and his title returned to the obverse, and the reverse featured wheat. This was the first time that a crown (which the coin's name comes from) had been omitted.

The portrait of Christian X was replaced by that of the new King Frederik IX of Denmark in 1947. The crown returned, above the Danish coat of arms.

=== Cupro-nickel coin ===
A cupro-nickel version was introduced in 1960 with the same design except the coat of arms was swapped with the Royal Coat of Arms, a distinct design. Its weight increased to 6.8 grams (0.24 oz). In 1973, the portrait on the coin was changed to the new queen, Margrethe II of Denmark. Her inscription was MARGRETHE II DANMARKS DRONNING (Margrethe II Denmark's Queen). The reverse remained the same.

The present-day design of the coin was first minted in 1992 and introduced into circulation on 26 January 1993. The Queen's monogram and the crown decorate the obverse in a pattern around a central hole, and the reverse is based on pre-historic Danish art. From 2000 onwards there are no mintmarks to the obverse. In December 2025, a new design was released featuring the monogram of Frederik X, the new monarch following the abdication of Margrethe II.
