= Fijian gold pacific sovereign =

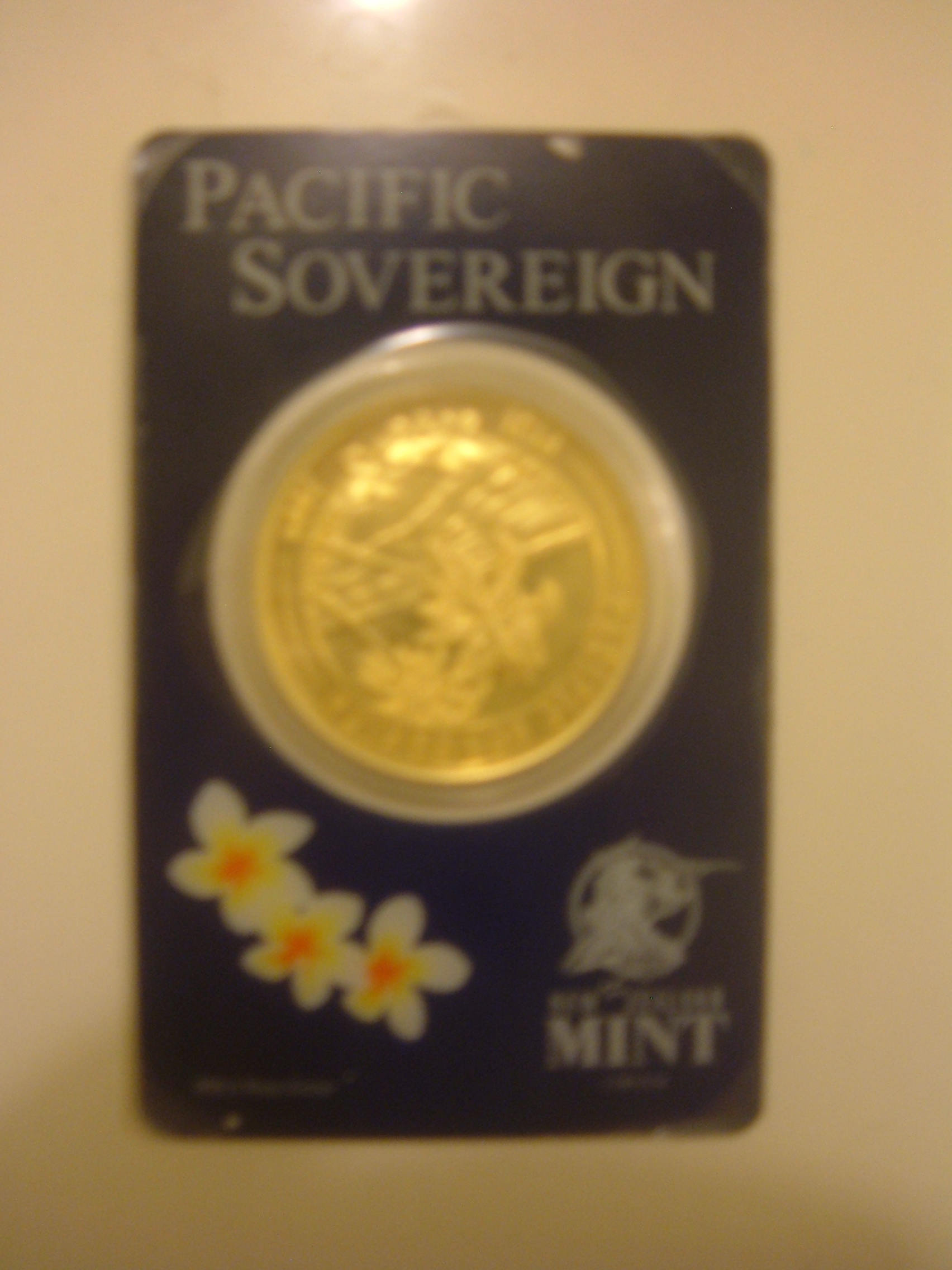
front pic

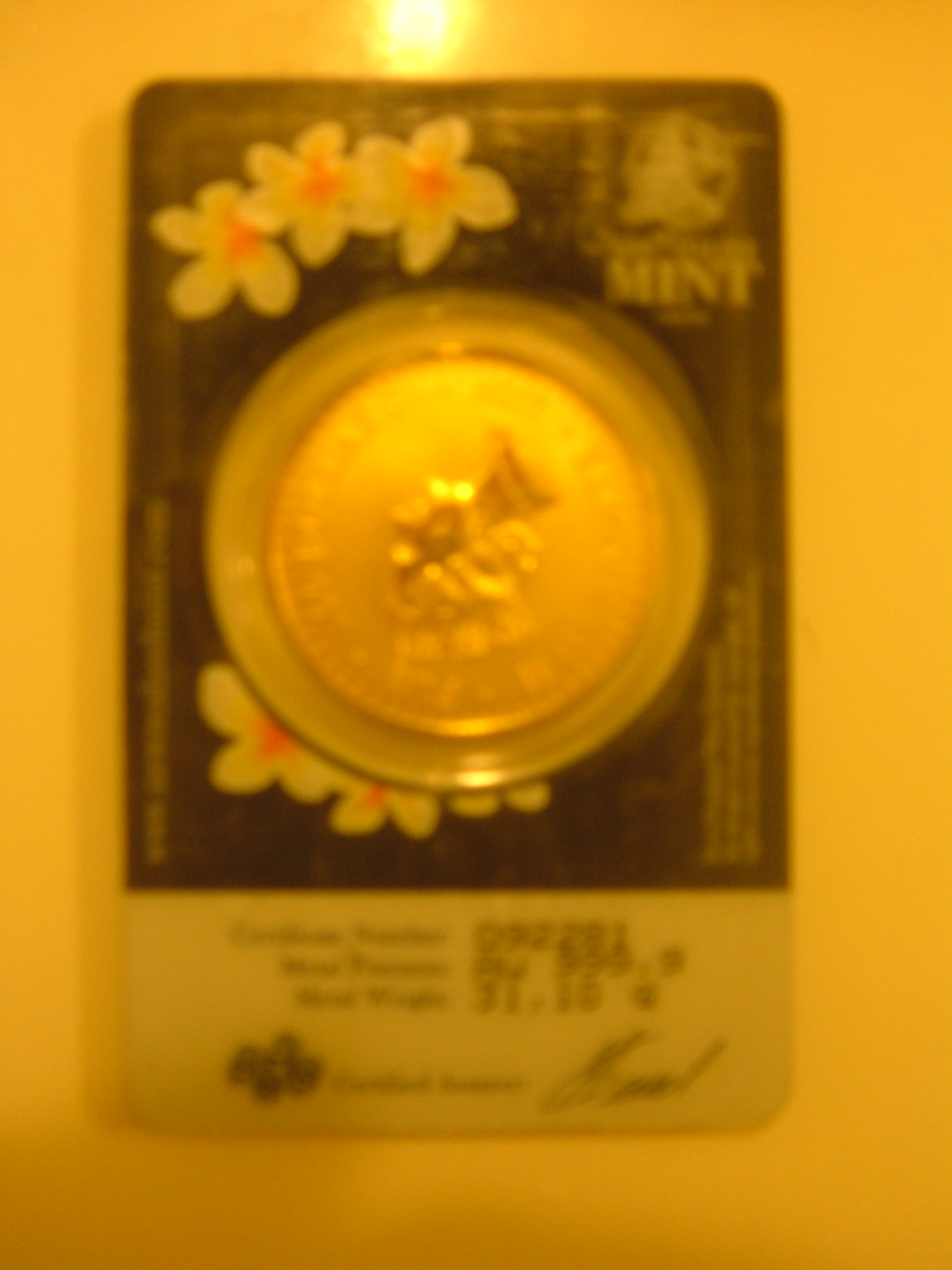
back pic

The Fijian gold Pacific Sovereign is a 24-karat, bullion, one-ounce gold coin of .9999 purity minted by the New Zealand Mint (first released mid-2009) in commemoration of the islands of Fiji, a sovereign nation and member of the Commonwealth of Nations.

== Specifications ==
1 troy ounce (oz) coin
Diameter:	32.0 millimeters
Thickness:	2.74 millimeters - 2.84 millimeters
Gross Weight:	1 troy ounce (31.104 grams)
Face Value:	100 Fijian Dollars (FJ$100)
