= Fifty øre (Danish coin) =

Denomination of the Danish krone

- Kingdom of Denmark; Denmark; Faroe Islands; Greenland
- Value: 0.50 Danish Krone
- Mass: 4.3 g
- Diameter: 21.5 mm
- Thickness: 1.55 mm
- Edge: smooth
- Orientation: Medallic
- Composition: 97% Copper, 2.5% Zinc & 0.5% Tin
- Years of minting: N/A
- Mintage: N/A
- Circulation: 3 July 1989 – present

Obverse
- Design: Face value, mint mark
- Designer: N/A

Reverse
- Design: Country-designation. Crown, year of minting
- Designer: N/A

The fifty øre coin is the smallest-denomination coin of the Danish krone having a value of half a krone. Since the removal of the 25 øre coin in 2008, it has been the only Danish coin with a face value of under one krone.

== Design ==
The design is almost identical to the 25 øre coin issued in 1991, the only differences being the face value of the coin and the size.

== History ==
The first coin of the denomination of half of a krone was a ½ krone coin issued in 1924, measuring 20mm in diameter and 2mm in thickness. It featured on its obverse the monogram of King Christian X of Denmark, and the crown on the reverse. It was made of aluminium bronze and shared its design with the krone coin of the time. Its last minting was in 1940 and it was demonetised on 31 December 1942.

The present fifty øre coin was introduced into circulation on 3 July 1989 after the demonetisation of the five and ten øre coins. Its obverse features the crown of King Christian V of Denmark. The coin is composed of a bronze of 97% copper, 2.5% zinc and 0.5% tin. As of August 2024, 50 øre worth 7.4 US cents.
