= 25 øre (World War II Danish coin) =

- Denmark
- Value: 25 Danish øre
- Mass: 3.6 g
- Diameter: 23 mm
- Edge: Reeded
- Composition: 100% Zn
- Years of minting: 1941-1945

Obverse
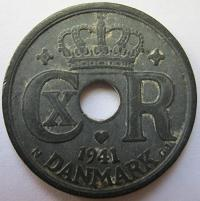
- Design: Crowned monogram of Christian X, and small heart below the hole Lettering: CX R 1941 N DANMARK GJ

Reverse
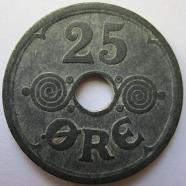
- Design: Denomination and two spirals next to the hole Lettering: 25 ORE

The 25 øre coin was minted between 1941 and 1945 during the German occupation of Denmark. They were made entirely of zinc, which was a cheap metal commonly used in the German-held territories for occupation currency.

== Mintage ==
Year	Mintage	Notes
1941	15,332,000	
1942	997,000	
1943	5,784,000	
1944	10,665,000	
1945	4,543,000	
