= Banknotes of New Zealand =

The banknotes of New Zealand comprise:

- Banknotes of the New Zealand pound, produced from 1840 to 1967
- Banknotes of the New Zealand dollar, produced from 1967 to present

== See also ==
- Coins of New Zealand
