= Øre =

Unit of Danish and Norwegian currency

Øre (plural øre, Danish pronunciation: [ˈøːɐ], Norwegian pronunciation: [ˈø̀ːrə]) is the centesimal subdivision of the Danish and Norwegian krone. The Faroese division is called the oyra, but is equal in value to the Danish coin. Before their discontinuation, the corresponding divisions of the Swedish krona and the Icelandic króna were the öre and the eyrir, respectively. The name øre/öre derives from Latin aureus "golden".

== Status in Denmark ==
The Danish 25 øre coin ceased to be legal tender on 1 October 2008. The only Danish coin currently in use with a value below DKr 1 is the 50 øre.

== Status in Norway ==
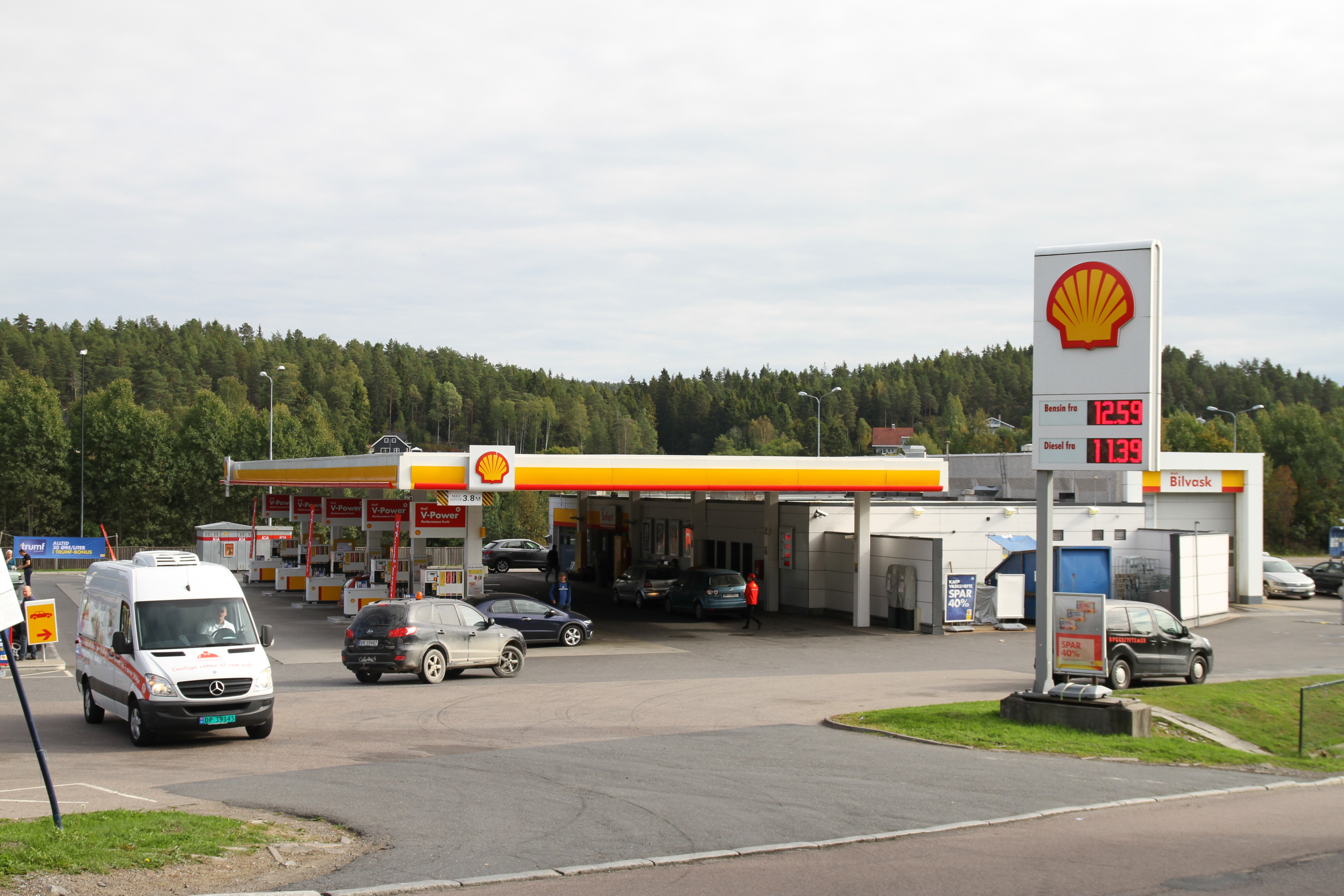
Litre prices at a petrol station in Mortensrud listed with øre decimals.

The Norwegian 10-øre coin was deprecated on 23 February 1992 and ceased to be legal tender in 1993. From then on, the only Norwegian coin in use with a value below NOK 1 was the 50-øre coin, which was also deprecated on 1 May 2012. The original value were the 1, 2, 5, 10, 25, and 50-øre coins.

The øre remains in use as of August 2025 on price tags and on the price signs at petrol stations. If payment is done digitally, the price with the øre is kept unchanged. If payment is done with cash, the sellers are required to round up or down to the nearest krone.

== See also ==
- Heller (money) (subdivision of Czech and Slovak crowns)
- Fillér (subdivision of Hungarian forint)
- Other coin names that are derived from the gold of which they were once made:
  - Florin
  - Öre
  - Guilder
  - Złoty
