= Coins of New Zealand =

The coins of New Zealand comprise:

- Coins of the New Zealand pound, produced from 1933 to 1965, with British coinage used from 1857 to 1935
- Coins of the New Zealand dollar, produced from 1967 to present

== See also ==
- Banknotes of New Zealand
