= New Zealand Mint =

Privately owned company in Auckland

New Zealand Mint (Māori: Te Kamupene Whakanao o Aotearoa) is a privately owned company in Auckland, New Zealand. It is the only privately owned mint in New Zealand, purchasing refined gold from international sources to produce coins. The company trades in precious metals including gold bullion, and is a physical storage provider.

The mint produces collector and bullion coins for a number of pacific nations, including Fiji and Niue.

During the late-2000s recession, New Zealand Mint saw a substantial upturn of business, doing a month's worth of transactions each day when the large U.S. investment banks such as Bear Stearns failed.

The mint does not produce bank notes or coins of the New Zealand dollar - those coins are minted primarily at the Royal Mint and Royal Canadian Mint for the Reserve Bank of New Zealand.
