= Cook Islands dollar =

Currency of the Cook Islands

Tāra Kūki 'Āirani (Cook Islands Māori)
- Cook Islands 3-dollar note

ISO 4217
- Code: NZD (numeric: 554)
- Subunit: 0.01

Units of account
- Symbol: $
- Subunit
- 1/100: cent / tene
- Symbol
- cent / tene: c

Denominations
- Banknotes: $3
- Coins: 10c, 20c, 50c, $1, $2, $5

Demographics
- Date of introduction: 1987
- User(s): Cook Islands (alongside New Zealand dollar)

Issuance
- Printer: De La Rue
- Website: www.delarue.com
- Mint: Royal Australian Mint
- Website: www.ramint.gov.au

Valuation
- Inflation: 2.1%
- Source: The World Factbook, 2005 est.
- Pegged with: New Zealand dollar at par

The Cook Islands dollar is one of two current currencies of the Cook Islands, where it is used alongside the New Zealand dollar. The dollar is subdivided into 100 cents, with some older 50-cent coins carrying the denomination as "50 tene".

Since 1995, the only valid Cook Islands banknote is the 3-dollar banknote; coins exist for 10, 20 and 50 cents, as well as for 1, 2 and 5 Cook Islands dollars.

== History ==
Until 1967, the New Zealand pound was used in the Cook Islands, when it was replaced by the New Zealand dollar.

In 1972, local issues of coins of the New Zealand dollar began to be released for the Cook Islands.

In 1987, the Cook Islands dollar was established and pegged at par to the New Zealand dollar, with each Cook Islands dollar backed by a New Zealand dollar held by the Treasury of the Cook Islands government and freely interchangeable; the New Zealand dollar remained legal tender alongside the new currency.

The Currency Reserves Amendment Act 1989 modified the required backing of Cook Islands dollars to 50% of the face value for circulating currency, and 2% of the face value for currency not intended for circulation (proof, uncirculated, and souvenir coin sets; uncut note sheets).

By 1993, circulating $3 notes were only backed by 5% of their face value in NZD, and coins were not backed at all. Meanwhile, the rate of currency issuance, and governmental budget deficits, had increased such that the national debt was nearly double annual GDP. Eventually, commercial banks refused to convert the currency to New Zealand dollars resulting in capital flight and an economic crisis. This prompted the government to revert to using the New Zealand dollar as the country's currency in April 1995. Cook Islands dollar banknotes other than the $3 notes ceased to be legal tender, although they remained convertible to New Zealand dollars at the Cook Islands Treasury until 2005.

Since then, the only valid Cook Islands dollar banknote is the 3-dollar banknote; the most recent version of the banknote was issued in Augustu 2021, made of polymer.

Coins exist for 10, 20 and 50 cents, as well as for 1, 2 and 5 Cook Islands dollars;

Coins have been struck on occasions mainly by the Royal Australian Mint, the Franklin Mint and National Collecter's Mint in the United States, and the Perth Mint, with the paper currency being printed by De La Rue in England.

== Coins ==
In 1972, bronze 1 and 2-cent, and cupro-nickel 5, 10, 20, and 50-cent, and 1-dollar coins were introduced. All were the same size, mass, and composition as the corresponding New Zealand coins, however, the unique British crown-sized dollar coin circulated much more readily than its New Zealand equal. Each coin depicted plants, animals, and items unique to the Cook Islands.

In 1983, production of the 1 and 2-cent coins was ceased and the two coins were later demonetized – almost 10 years before the equivalent occurred in New Zealand.

The Cook Islands has a long reputation for frequent monetary oddities. It was one of the last countries to hold on to large crown-sized coins ($1 of the 1972-83 issue) while elsewhere, coins of such size are no longer minted in large enough quantities intended for circulation.

In 1987, a smaller, lighter scallop-edged $1 coin with a similar size and shape to the Hong Kong $2 piece was issued. This coin was produced to replace its bulky predecessor. With the release of its new $2 piece in that year, the Cook Islands became the first modern country to issue a circulating triangular coin, along with a dodecagonal (twelve-sided) $5 piece in equal size and shape to the Australian 50-cent coin. These $1 and $2 were composed of cupro-nickel and the $5 coin was in aluminium bronze.

1988 brought the redesign of the 50-cent piece, the first coin in the country to bear a denomination name. Although widely recognized as "cents" this coin depicts "tene", the Cook Islands Māori equivalent to the English word cent.

In 1995, the Cook Islands dollar was withdrawn in favour of the New Zealand dollar only. Local coins remained in use and technically became denominated in New Zealand dollars, likewise for future coin issues even as they continued to be inscribed with the words "Cook Islands".

A large, stainless steel 5-cent coin was issued in 2000 centred on the theme of the UN's Food and Agriculture Organization and food security, depicting the image Tangaroa, the Polynesian sea god also present on the dollar piece.

2003 saw the reintroduction of a 1-cent coin, this time composed of aluminium rather than bronze and slightly smaller and thicker than the 10-cent piece. These were issued with five different reverses, each commemorating a few of the nation's historical themes.

With the reduction in size of New Zealand's 10, 20, and 50-cent coins in 2006, older cent coins began to be phased out in both countries. However, $1, $2, and $5 pieces remained in use. Although a 2010 commemorative Cook Islands coin set in denominations 1, 2, 5, 10, 20, and 50-cents and a bimetallic $1 have been minted with a similar size to some of the newer New Zealand ones, these coins are for collectors and intended to raise money for the Cook Islands government, rather than for release into circulation.

In 2015, as part of a coinage reform, new coins were minted by the Royal Australian Mint. The new coins carry similar designs to the older ones with the 10, 20, and 50-cents struck in nickel-plated steel, while the 1, 2, and 5-dollar coins are struck in brass-plated steel. The new 5-dollar coin features a traditional vaka (a type of canoe) instead of a conch. The cents are smaller than previous issues with closer size and mass to the current coins of New Zealand while the new dollars continue to have their distinctive shapes. On 30 April 2016, all coins issued until 2010 lost legal tender status and were withdrawn from circulation.

The obverse of all current coins (2015 series) of the Cook Islands depict Queen Elizabeth II, the Head of State of the United Kingdom, of the Commonwealth of Nations and of the Realm of New Zealand.

The reverse of standard issue coins are as depicted:

=== Currently valid coins (2015 series) ===
| Value | Diameter | Composition | 2015 | |
| Value | Diameter | Composition | Obverse | Reverse |
|---|---|---|---|---|
| 10 cents | 19 mm | Nickel-plated steel | Queen | Orange on branch |
| 20 cents | 21 mm | Nickel-plated steel | Queen | Fairy tern |
| 50 cents | 24.2 mm | Nickel-plated steel | Queen | Albacore tuna |
| 1 dollar | 28.52 mm | Brass-plated steel | Queen | Tangaroa, sea god in Māori mythology |
| 2 dollars | 26 mm | Brass-plated steel | Queen | Mortar and pestle |
| 5 dollars | 33 mm | Brass-plated steel | Queen | Vaka |

=== Old coins (no longer valid) ===
| Value | Diameter | Composition | 1972–2010 | |
| Value | Diameter | Composition | Obverse | Reverse |
|---|---|---|---|---|
| 1 cent | 18 mm | Bronze | Queen | Taro leaf |
| 2 cents | 21 mm | Bronze | Queen | Pineapples |
| 5 cents | 19 mm | Cupronickel | Queen | Hibiscus blossom |
| 10 cents | 24 mm | Cupronickel | Queen | Orange on branch |
| 20 cents | 29 mm | Cupronickel | Queen | Fairy tern |
| 50 cents | 32 mm | Cupronickel | Queen | Bonito (1972–87; also 1992); Sea turtle (1988–94) |
| 1 dollar | 30 mm | Cupronickel | Queen | Tangaroa, sea god in Māori mythology |
| 2 dollars | 27/27/27 mm | Cupronickel | Queen | Mortar and pestle |
| 5 dollars | 33 mm | Nickel-brass | Queen | Pacific Triton Conch |

=== Commemorative coins ===
The Cook Islands also issue a large number of commemorative non-circulating collectors' coins featuring an almost endless array of themes, as the government has a contract in which a coin design can be commissioned and minted with the name "Cook Islands" and dollar units for a fee, making coinage a resource for extra revenue. Due to exchange schemes involving large stocks of non-circulating commemorative coins, mintages are regulated and not recognized or accepted as legal tender within the Cook Islands.

== Banknotes ==
On 20 July 1987, 3, 10, and 20-dollar notes were introduced by the government, followed by 50-dollar notes as part of a new series of notes in 1992. The notes all bear images of items, events, and panorama relevant to native Polynesian culture.

In June 1995, the government of the Cook Islands began exchanging all of the larger banknotes for New Zealand currency, but the 3-dollar note and all coins remain in use.

In 2015, the Cook Islands Ministry of Finance and Economic Management sold its final stocks of Cook Islands banknotes by tender.

On 4 August 2021, the Cook Islands Ministry of Finance and Economic Management issued a new 3-dollar banknote, being printed on polymer.

=== Currently valid banknote (2021 series) ===
2021 Series
| Value | Obverse | Reverse |
|---|---|---|
| $3 | | |

=== Old banknotes (no longer valid) ===
1992 Series
| Value | Obverse | Reverse |
|---|---|---|
| $3 | | |
| $10 | | |
| $20 | | |
| $50 | | |

1987 Series
| Value | Obverse | Reverse |
|---|---|---|
| $3 | | |
| $10 | | |
| $20 | | |

== See also ==
- Economy of the Cook Islands
- New Zealand dollar
- Niue dollar
- Pitcairn Islands dollar
