= Platinum coins of the Russian Empire =

Platinum coinage in Russia

The Russian Empire minted platinum coins from 1828 to 1845, with face values of 3, 6 and 12 rubles.

== History ==
A "new Siberian metal", platinum, became known in Russia in 1819. Though it was first observed only as minor inclusions in rocks, richer deposits were discovered in the late 1824 which were mined beginning in 1825. These discoveries prompted Demidov to start looking for platinum around his Nizhny Tagil plants, where it was quickly found along the river beds. In late 1826, P.G. Sobolevsky (the father of powder metallurgy in Russia) invented a simple way of processing platinum that prompted the idea to use platinum in coins. The decree of 24 April 1828 A.D. noted that "among the treasures of the Ural Mountains also occurs platinum, which previously was located almost exclusively in South America. For easy sale of this precious metal, it is desirable to introduce it in coins" and also described the design of new coins.

Minting began with 3-ruble coins, 6-ruble and 12-ruble coins were added in 1829 and 1830, respectively. 1,371,691 3-ruble coins were minted, along with 14,847 6-ruble and 3,474 12-ruble coins. The first coin was sent to the prominent German scientist Alexander von Humboldt, who was previously asked to evaluate the use of platinum as a currency and confirm its price relative to silver. After his death, the emperor Alexander II bought that coin, and in 1859 it was returned to Russia and later became an exhibit of the Hermitage Museum in Saint Petersburg.

Humboldt's fame as a world famous explorer and geologist created a demand for his advice about the role of platinum in coinage. Count Georg Ludwig Cancrin, the Minister of Finance in the Russian cabinet, addressed a letter to Humboldt on August 15, 1827. "Cancrin wrote to request information about platinum as a possible Russian currency. Platinum had been found in the Ural Mountains five years previously and Cancrin hoped that Humboldt would be able to provide him with information about the platinum currency that was used in Colombia. He knew that Humboldt still had close connections in South America." Count Cancrin also was "requesting information as to the proportionate value of that metal with respect to gold and silver... Humboldt, in his reply, dated November 19, 1827, treated the subject from a truly scientific point of view; he discountenanced the project of instituting a platinum coinage, on account of the impossibility of its maintaining an unalterable value with respect to gold and silver" In the same letter he mentions having counselled the Mexican Government against the introduction of a platinum coinage.

Some merchants preferred platinum coins because their higher melting point of 1,768 °C (3,214 °F) meant that they were much less likely to be melted in a house fire like gold or silver coins often were; gold melts at 1,064 °C (1,947 °F) and silver at 962 °C (1,764 °F), and house fires typically reach a maximum temperature of 1,000–1,500 °C (1,800–2,700 °F).

== Discontinuation ==
The minting was discontinued on 22 June 1845 because of the concerns about possible financial imbalance due to the declining price of platinum; within the next 6 months, platinum coins were withdrawn from circulation. An estimated 883,212 rubles were then in the hands of the population. Platinum coins then were considered neither an investment nor collectible item and were readily exchanged to the "more reliable" gold.

The 11–32 tonnes of platinum, raw and in coins, that had accumulated at the St. Petersburg Mint by 1846 was sold to the British firm Johnson, Matthey & Co. This sale made Britain a platinum monopolist even though it did not produce platinum domestically. Russia and Colombia were the only major platinum producers. Other possible reasons for discontinuing the platinum mint were low popularity among the population and the high cost of minting, which was 98 kopeks per 3-ruble coin as compared to less than 1 kopek per gold ruble.

There were fruitless attempts to resume the platinum mint in 1859, which resulted in a scientific study on the usage of platinum in coins by academician Moritz von Jacobi, published in 1860. No country had used platinum for money after 1846, and one reason for that could be that platinum was about 2.5 times cheaper than gold in the 19th century. Currently, the platinum coins of the Russian Empire are rare, especially for the period from 1839 to 1840 when only a few coins were minted. All platinum coins minted in 1840 were bought by the famous numismatist Count Ivan Ivanovich Tolstoy directly from the Saint Petersburg Mint; on the numismatic auction of the United Bank of Switzerland (UBS Gold and Silver Auction 50) held in autumn 2001 in Basel, one of the two 12-ruble coins minted in 1839 was sold for US$60,500 (with a starting price of $22,000).

== Specifications ==
Minters used the same forms for the platinum and traditional silver coins, but platinum is twice as heavy as silver, and it was approximately 6 times more expensive than silver at the time. The platinum three ruble coin had the same size as the silver 25 kopek (1/4 ruble) coin; it weighed twice as much and was thus valued 12 times higher. For this reason, the coin is specifically marked as "3 rubles per silver" (Russian: 3 рубля на серебро, romanized: 3 rublya na serebro). The same reasoning applied to the 6- and 12-ruble coins. The coins were minted from native Ural platinum. It was not free from such noble metals as iridium and palladium, and thus the accompanying phrase "pure Ural platinum" (Russian: чистой уральской платины, romanized: chistoy uralskoy platiny) only meant that no metal was intentionally added in production.

Platinum coins of Imperial Russia
Date of the issuing decree
12 September 1830	30 November 1829	24 April 1828
Weight, g
41.41	20.71	10.35

== Mintages ==
The following mintages are measured in rubles, not by piece.

Year	12-ruble	6-ruble	3-ruble	Total
1828	-	-	60,069	60,069
1829	-	4,968	130,347	135,315
1830	1,428	51,660	318,078	371,166
1831	17,556	16,704	259,500	293,760
1832	13,224	9,012	197,301	219,537
1833	3,060	1,812	253,620	258,492
1834	132	66	272,916	273,114
1835	1,524	642	415,512	417,678
1836	132	66	131,256	131,454
1837	636	1,518	138,909	141,063
1838	144	72	145,536	145,752
1839	24	12	6	42
1840	12	6	3	21
1841	900	1,020	50,763	52,683
1842	1,380	726	436,734	438,840
1843	1,464	762	517,005	519,231
1844	48	24	643,512	643,584
1845	24	12	15,006	15,042
Total:	41,688	89,082	4,121,073 (Note: Typo in the source. The correct value is 4121073, not 412,073)	4,251,843
