= Faroese króna =

Currency of the Faroe Islands

føroysk króna (Faroese); færøsk krone (Danish)

ISO 4217
- Code: None (FOK unofficially)

Units of account
- Plural: krónur
- Symbol: kr
- Subunit
- 1/100: oyra
- Plural
- oyra: oyru(r)

Denominations
- Banknotes
- Freq. used: 50, 100, 200, 500 kroner
- Rarely used: 1000 krone
- Coins: Danish coins circulate: 50 oyru(r), 1, 2, 5, 10, 20 krónur

Demographics
- User(s): Faroe Islands (Denmark), alongside krone

Issuance
- Central bank: Danmarks Nationalbank
- Website: www.nationalbanken.dk

Valuation
- Inflation: 2%
- Source: Statistics Faroe Islands, 2024
- Method: Consumer price index
- Pegged with: Danish krone at par

The króna (plural: krónur; sign: kr) is the currency of the Faroe Islands. It is issued by Danmarks Nationalbank, the central bank of Denmark. It is not a separate currency, but is rather a local issue of banknotes denominated in the Danish krone, although Danish-issued coins are still used. Consequently, it does not have an ISO 4217 currency code and instead shares that of the Danish krone, DKK. This means that in the Faroe Islands, credit cards are charged in Danish kroner. The króna is subdivided into 100 oyru(r).

== History ==
The Danish krone was used in the Faroes when German forces invaded and occupied metropolitan Denmark on 9 April 1940. The UK swiftly occupied the Faroe Islands. All exchange between the Faroes and Denmark halted as a result of the German occupation of Denmark, leaving one currency to develop in two markets independent of each other. On 31 May 1940, special Faroese banknotes were introduced. They consisted of Danish notes with a special stamp. These notes replaced unstamped Danish at par.

From 14 October 1940, new banknotes were printed "on behalf of the National Bank of Denmark." The value of these new banknotes was the same as those already in use. On 18 December 1940, a Currency Central was established in order to monitor foreign trade and to secure the solvency of the Faroes. Currency Central was headed by a board of nine, the judge, who was chairman, one representative of Faroe Fish Export, one representative of the Faroese Merchants' Union, one representative of the bank Føroya Banki, one representative of the savings bank Føroya Sparikassi and four representatives of the Løgting.

On 18 December 1940, the Faroese króna was pegged to the British pound at a rate of 22.4 krónur = 1 pound. This rate was officially accepted by the British government in a treaty titled "Agreement between His Britannic Majesty's Government and the Administration of the Faroe Islands, for Regulating the Financial Relations between the United Kingdom and the Faroe Islands," which came into force on 27 March 1941. At the same time, the Board of the Currency Central was reorganised to only three members, one representative of the British Government, one representative of the State (referring to the State of Denmark, meaning the County of Faroe), and one representative of the Løgting or the parliamentary National Board. In 1941, coins were struck in London for use on the Faroe Islands.

As of 12 April 1949, the Faroese króna was separated from the pound sterling and fixed to the Danish krone at parity. This arrangement is still in effect. Although Faroese banknotes were issued "on behalf of the National Bank of Denmark," the National Bank of Denmark does not claim any rights to Faroese banknotes issued prior to 1951.

== Coins ==
The Faroe Islands use standard Danish coinage, but the region has experienced a shortage of small currency on several occasions, leading to non-standard issues.

During the late 19th century, German national C.F. Siemsen, a merchant conducting business in both the Faroe Islands and Iceland, issued his own private coinage. This issue is brass, one side carrying the inscription: CFS and the other side the denomination: 4 or 16 skilling in goods ("x SKILLING I VARE"). Due to a shortage of currency in 1929–33, two merchants issued their own coins as well; J.F. Kjølbro in Klaksvík and S.P. Petersens Eftf in Fuglafjørður. The Kjølbro issue is aluminium coins with denominations of 10, 25 and 50 øre, and 1, 2, 5, and 10 kroner. S.P. Petersens Eftf's issue was made of brass in denominations of 5, 10 and 25 øre, and 1, 2 and 5 kroner.

During World War II, the Faroe Islands were separated from Denmark proper due to the occupations by the United Kingdom and Germany respectively. In 1941, a set of coins (1, 2, 5, 10 and 25 øre) was minted in London to alleviate a shortage of small change. This issue was identical to the pre-war Danish coinage already circulating, but is easily identified: the coins minted in London were made of bronze and copper-nickel, while the comparable coins minted in Denmark in 1941 were made of aluminium and zinc (with one exception). In addition, the British made set lacks both the mark of the Royal Danish Mint (a small heart) and the initials of the engraver and the mint master in Copenhagen.

== Banknotes ==
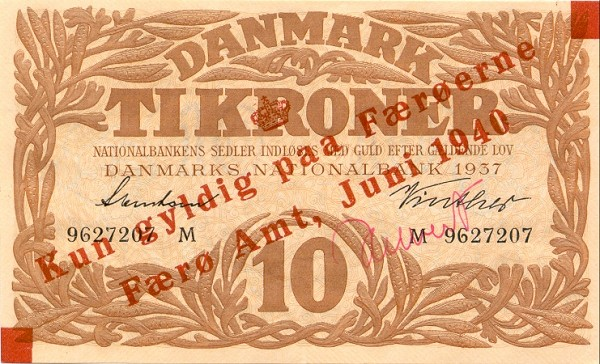
Danish 10 kroner banknote with June 1940 overstamp

In 1940, Danish 5, 20, 50, 100, and 500 kroner notes were overstamped with Kun Gyldig paa Færøerne, Færø Amt, Juni 1940 (meaning “Only valid on the Faroe Islands, Faroe County, June 1940”) for issue on the Faroe Islands. Later that year, the Færø Amt issued distinct notes in denominations of 1, 5, 10, and 100 kroner. From 1951, notes were issued with texts in Faroese. The 1 kroner note was not continued, with 50 krónur introduced in 1967, followed by 500 and 1000 krónur in 1978, 20 krónur in 1986 and 200 krónur in 2003.

Between 2001 and 2005, a new banknote series with new security features was introduced to replace older notes. Denominations are 50, 100, 200, 500, and 1000 krónur. On March 19, 2012, an updated version of the Faroese króna banknotes was released into circulation. The new notes are identical to the current issues, but the new notes now feature "Motion" windowed security threads and perfect registration devices instead of holographic patches on the fronts, and mother-of-pearl threads, and fluorescent colors added on the back of the notes.

Faroese banknotes (2001–)
Image	Value	Dimensions	Main colour	Description		Date of issue
Image	Value	Dimensions	Main colour	Obverse	Reverse	Date of issue
	50 kroner	125 × 72 mm	Grey	Ram's horn	Cliff near Sumba	3 July 2001
	100 kroner	135 × 72 mm	Gold	Cod's tail	Klaksvík	16 January 2003
	200 kroner	145 × 72 mm	Purple	Ghost moth	Tindhólmur	19 January 2004
	500 kroner	155 × 72 mm	Green	Shore crab	Hvannasund	30 November 2004
	1000 kroner	165 × 72 mm	Red	Purple sandpiper	Sandoy	15 September 2005

== Bank transfers ==
For international bank transfers, including credit card transfers, the ISO code has to be given. The Faroese króna has no official ISO 4217 code, so DKK is used for all credit card statements for visitors and international transfers of krónur (unless some other currency is used). Still transfers between Denmark and the Faroe Islands count as international with corresponding fees, and the Faroe Islands have their own IBAN and BIC codes with FO in them.

== Current exchange rates ==
Current DKK exchange rates
From Google Finance:	AUD CAD CHF CNY EUR GBP HKD JPY USD EUR JPY USD
From Yahoo! Finance:	AUD CAD CHF CNY EUR GBP HKD JPY USD EUR JPY USD
From XE.com:	AUD CAD CHF CNY EUR GBP HKD JPY USD EUR JPY USD
From OANDA:	AUD CAD CHF CNY EUR GBP HKD JPY USD EUR JPY USD

== Numismatics ==
Faroese banknotes are no longer available to collectors from Danmarks Nationalbank since their web shop was closed at the end of 2023. Postverk Føroya, the Faroese postal service now known as Posta, used to be the sole supplier of Faroese banknotes to collectors, but does not sell banknotes anymore.

== See also ==
- Exchange rate regime
- British occupation of the Faroe Islands
- Economy of the Faroe Islands
