= Pitcairn Islands dollar =

Commemorative currency of Pitcairn Islands

Pitkern Ailen dollar (Pitcairn-Norfolk) PND (informal)

ISO 4217
- Code: None

Unit
- Symbol: $
- Nickname: none

Denominations
- Subunit
- 1/100: cent
- Symbol
- cent: c
- Banknotes: $5, $10, $20, $50, $100 (New Zealand notes only)
- Coins: 5c, 10c, 20c, 50c, $1, $2 (only New Zealand coins circulate officially)

Demographics
- User(s): Pitcairn Islands

Issuance
- Printer: Note Printing Australia (provides base polymer note material)
- Website: www.noteprinting.com

Valuation
- Inflation: NA
- Pegged by: New Zealand dollar

The Pitcairn Islands is a British overseas territory which uses the New Zealand dollar as its primary currency. However, the territory has issued commemorative Pitcairn Islands dollar coins since 1988. Although the Pitcairn Islands dollar is legal tender and pegged at par to the New Zealand dollar, it is not commonly used in general circulation and exists primarily to generate revenue for the territory from coin collectors, with the sale of coins and other numismatic items being a major source of revenue for the territory. Having a population of only 45 as of 2020 and with only one island in the group of four being populated, there is no need for local coinage. Coins are an important part of the Pitcairn Islands' tiny economy and help raise funds for the government's largely fixed and subsidised income.

== Coins ==
New Zealand coins and notes circulate in the Pitcairn Islands. However, the Pitcairn Islands began issuing its first denominational coin set in 2009. They were in six denominations of copper-plated bronze 5, and 10 cents, nickel-plated bronze 20 and 50 cents, and bronze $1, and $2 pieces. They come in Uncirculated and Proof conditions and could be acquired in packaged sets or in rolls. The reverse of each coin depicts a relic from H.M.A.V. Bounty along with its description and the coin's denomination. This is surrounded by a fine border.

The coins are of similar size, weight and colour to those of a similar set from Niue. The Pitcairn Islands set also includes a 5 cent piece which New Zealand no longer uses.

A majority of Pitcairn Islands coins are minted in New Zealand or in Australia. But many bullion commemoratives have also been made by the Royal Mint in the United Kingdom and other private mints under the order of the Pitcairn Islands Government.

=== Reverse sides ===
The coin reverses depict as follows:

- 5 cents: Bounty Anchor
- 10 cents: Bounty ship's bell
- 20 cents: Bounty Bible
- 50 cents: Pitcairn longboat
- 1 dollar: Bounty cannon
- 2 dollars: H.M.A.V. Bounty's Helm

After 2022, King Charles III is depicted on all coins of the Pitcairn Islands as Head of State and King of the United Kingdom of Great Britain and Northern Ireland, of which the Pitcairn Islands are a territory.

Although the coins are not circulating on the island, the coin sets may be purchased at the Pitcairn Islands General Post Office in the capital of Adamstown.

During 2021, the Pitcairn Islands started issuing pound and pence denominated pieces. These are however not legal tender, as the Currency Ordinance of the Pitcairn Islands prescribes that the islands can only issue legal tender coins that have a denomination in dollars and cents.
