= Danish krone =

Currency of Denmark

dansk krone (Danish); donsk króna (Faroese); danskit koruuni (Greenlandic)
500 kroner banknote
1 krone coin

ISO 4217
- Code: DKK (numeric: 208)
- Subunit: 0.01

Units of account
- Base unit: krone
- Plural: kroner
- Symbol: kr.
- Subunit
- 1/100: øre
- Plural
- øre: øre (singular and plural)

Denominations
- Banknotes: 50, 100, 200, 500 kroner
- Coins: 50-øre, 1, 2, 5, 10, 20 kroner

Demographics
- Replaced: Danish rigsdaler
- User(s): Kingdom of Denmark: Denmark; Greenland; Faroe Islands^{1}

Issuance
- Central bank: Danmarks Nationalbank
- Website: nationalbanken.dk
- Printer: Oberthur Fiduciaire
- Website: oberthur-fiduciaire.com
- Mint: Mint of Finland
- Website: rahapaja.fi

Valuation
- Inflation: 1.9%
- Source: Statistics Denmark, December 2024
- Method: Consumer price index

EU Exchange Rate Mechanism (ERM)
- Since: 13 March 1979
- 1 € =: 7.46038 kr.
- Band: ± 2.25%
- Special banknotes are issued for use on the Faroe Islands–see Faroese króna

The krone (Danish: [ˈkʰʁoːnə]; plural: kroner; sign: kr.; code: DKK) is the official currency of the Kingdom of Denmark (comprising Denmark, Greenland, and the Faroe Islands), introduced on 1 January 1875. Both the ISO code "DKK" and currency sign "kr." are in common use; the former precedes the value, the latter in some contexts follows it. The currency is sometimes referred to as the Danish crown in English, since krone literally means crown. Krone coins have been minted in Denmark since the 17th century.

One krone is subdivided into 100 øre (Danish pronunciation: [ˈøːɐ]; singular and plural), the name øre is probably derived from the Latin word for gold. Altogether there are ten denominations of the krone, with the smallest being the 50 øre coin (one half of a krone). Formerly there were more øre coins, but those were discontinued due to inflation.

The krone is pegged to the euro via the ERM II, the European Union's exchange rate mechanism. Adoption of the euro is favoured by some of the major political parties; however, a 2000 referendum on joining the eurozone was defeated with 53.2% voting to maintain the krone and 46.8% voting to join the eurozone.

== History ==
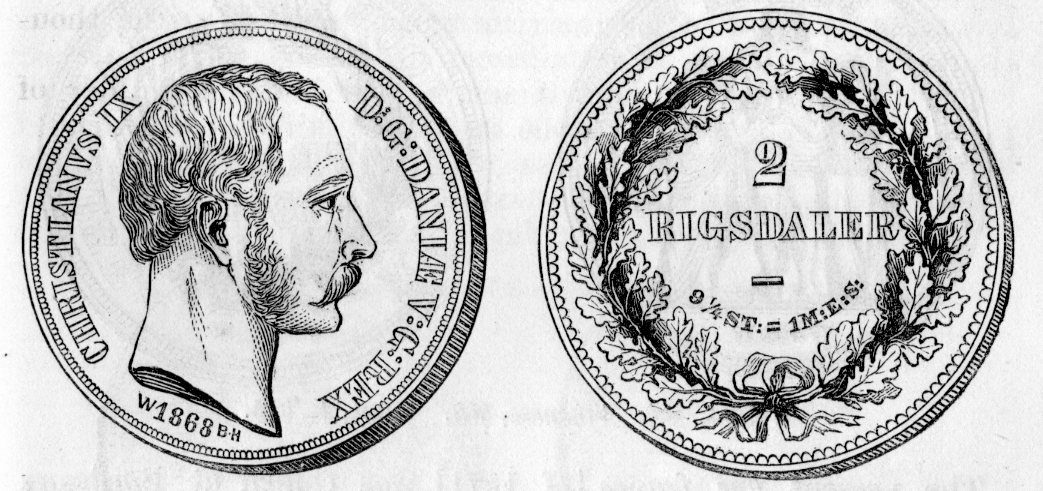
A Danish silver two-rigsdaler piece from 1868, with a portrait of Christian IX

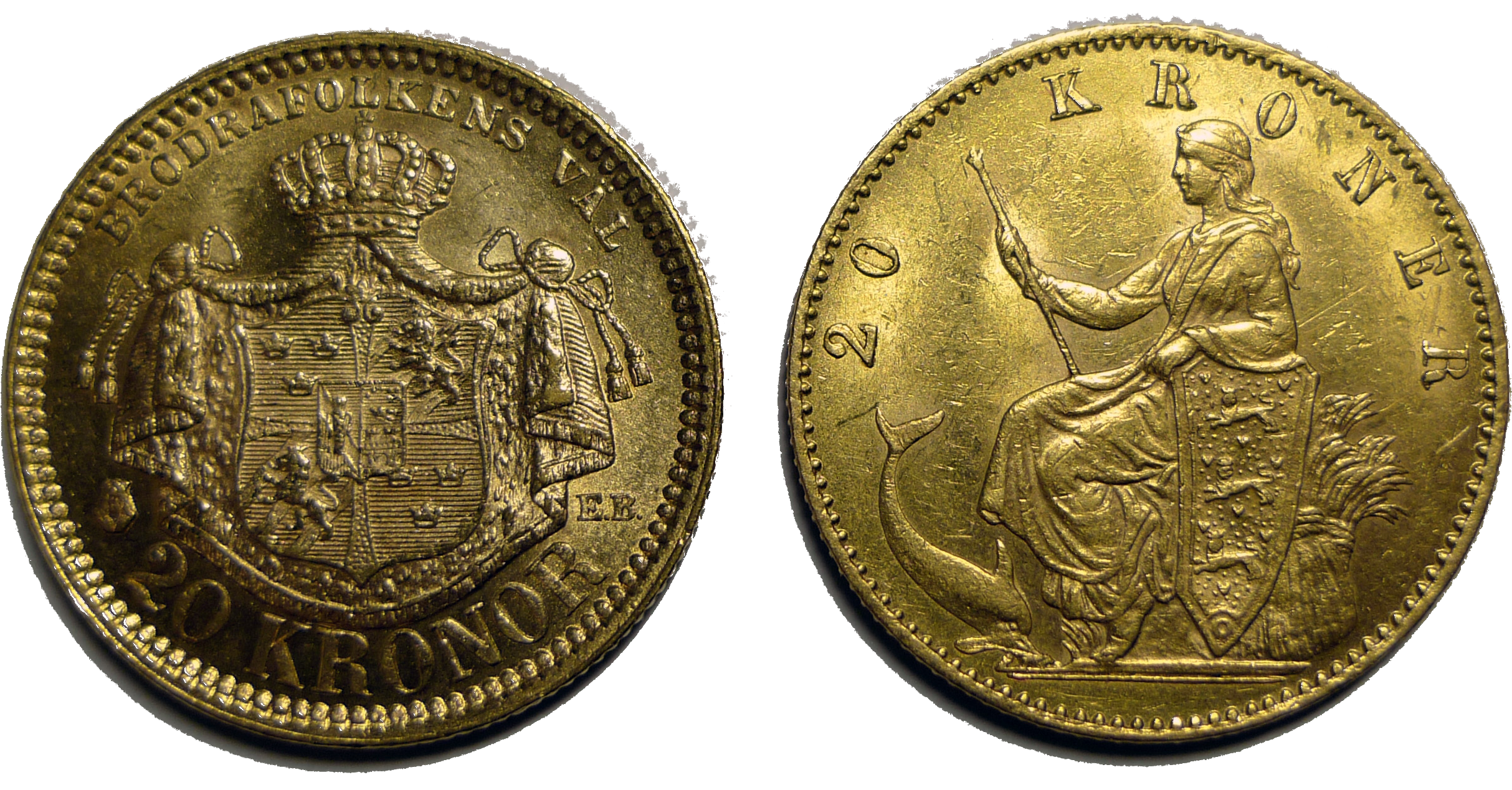
Two golden 20-kroner coins from the Scandinavian Monetary Union, with identical weight and composition. The coin to the left is Swedish and the right one is Danish.

The oldest known Danish coin is a penny (penning) struck AD 825–840, but the earliest systematic minting produced the so-called korsmønter (lit. 'cross coins') minted by Harald Bluetooth in the late 10th century. Organised minting in Denmark was introduced on a larger scale by Canute the Great in the 1020s. Lund (now in Sweden) was the principal minting place and one of Denmark's most important cities in the Middle Ages, but coins were also minted in Roskilde, Slagelse, Odense, Aalborg, Århus, Viborg, Ribe, Ørbæk and Hedeby. For almost 1,000 years, Danish kings – with a few exceptions – have issued coins with their name, monogram and/or portrait.

Danish coinage was generally based on the Carolingian silver standard, with 12 penning to a skilling and 20 skilling to a pound; later on, 16 skilling to a mark. The metal content of minted coins was subject to debasement over the centuries, an easy way to generate income for the monarch and/or the state. Taxes were sometimes imposed via the coinage, such as by the compulsory substitution of coins handed in by new coins handed out with a lower silver content. As a result of the debasement, the public started to lose trust in the respective coins. Danish currency was overhauled several times in attempts to restore public trust in the coins, and later issued in paper money.

Several different currency systems have been used by Denmark from the 16th to 19th centuries. The krone (lit. "crown") has existed as early as 1513 as a unit of account worth 8 marks. In more general use until 1813, however, was a krone or schlecht daler worth 2/3 rigsdaler, 4 marks, or 64 skilling.

The modern-day krone was introduced as the currency of Denmark in January 1875. It replaced the rigsdaler at a rate of 2 kroner = 1 rigsdaler. This placed the krone on the gold standard at a rate of 2,480 kroner = 1 kilogram fine gold. The latter part of the 18th century and much of the 19th century saw expanding economic activity and thus also a need for means of payment that were easier to handle than coins. Consequently, banknotes were increasingly used instead of coins.

The Danish krone was minted by the Royal Mint of Denmark and banknotes were printed by the Danish National Bank until 1975, when the mint was made a subsidiary of the National Bank. In 2014, it was decided to stop minting and printing of the krone in Denmark, but the work would be outsourced, and on 20 December 2016, the last notes were printed by the National Bank.

== Status ==
=== Relationship to the euro ===
Denmark has not introduced the euro, following a rejection by referendum in 2000, but the Danish krone is pegged closely to the euro (with the rate 7.46038±2.25%) in ERM II, the EU's exchange rate mechanism. Denmark borders one eurozone member, Germany, and one other EU member, Sweden, which is committed by treaty to join the euro in the future when conditions permit (though Sweden maintains that joining ERM II is voluntary, thus avoiding euro adoption for the time being).

=== Faroe Islands and Greenland ===
The Faroe Islands uses a localised, non-independent version of the Danish krone, known as the Faroese króna pegged with the Danish krone at par, using the Danish coin series, but have their own series of distinct banknotes, first being issued in the 1950s and later modernised in the 1970s and the 2000s.

Greenland adopted the Act on Banknotes in Greenland in 2006 with a view to introducing separate Greenlandic banknotes. The Act entered into force on 1 June 2007. In the autumn of 2010, a new Greenlandic government indicated that it did not wish to introduce separate Greenlandic banknotes and Danmarks Nationalbank ceased the project to develop a Greenlandic series. Still, Greenland continues to use Danish kroner as sole official currency. Historically, Greenland under the colonial administration issued distinct banknotes between 1803 and 1968, together with coins between 1926 and 1964 (see Greenland rigsdaler and Greenland krone).

Faroe Islands and Greenland have their own IBAN codes (FO and GL, while Denmark has DK). Transfers between the countries count as international with international fees, outside EU rules.

== Coins ==
=== Alloys and colour scheme ===
50-øre coin

1-krone coin

10-kroner coin

The design of the coin series is intended to ensure that the coins are easy to distinguish from each other:

The series is therefore divided into three sequences, each with its own metal colour. This division into colours has its roots in history. In earlier times, the value of the coins was equivalent to the value of the metal from which they were minted: gold was used for the coins of the highest denominations, silver for the next-highest, and copper for the lowest coin denominations. This correlation between colour and value has been retained in the present coin series (see examples to the right). The 50 øre coins are thus minted from copper-coloured bronze, the 1, 2 and 5 krone coins from a silver-coloured cupronickel alloy, and the 10 and 20 krone coins from golden aluminium bronze.

The coins differ in terms of size, weight and rim. Within each sequence the diameter and weight of the coins increase with their value. The 50 øre and 10 krone coins have smooth rims, while the rims of the 1 and 5 krone coins are milled. The rims of the 2 and 20 krone coins have interrupted milling. The 1, 2 and 5 krone coins have a hole in the middle. Use of these various characteristics makes it easy for the blind and sight-impaired to tell the coins apart.

Circulating coins
| Image | Value | Technical parameters | | | | Description | | | Issued from |
| Image | Value | Diameter (mm) | Thickness (mm) | Mass (g) | Composition | Edge | Obverse | Reverse | Issued from |
|---|---|---|---|---|---|---|---|---|---|
| | 50 øre | 21.50 | 1.55 | 4.30 | Tin-bronze | Smooth | Crown of Christian V | Heart (mintmark); value | 1989 |
| | 1 kr. | 20.25 | 1.60 | 3.60 | Cupronickel: Cu: 75%; Ni: 25% | Reeded | Monogram of Frederik X (Note: The coins circulate alongside the coins with the monogram of Queen Margrethe II.) | Traditional design (holed); Lettering: Danmark; value | 1992 |
| | 2 kr. | 24.50 | 1.80 | 5.90 | Cupronickel: Cu: 75%; Ni: 25% | Interrupted reeding | Monogram of Frederik X | Traditional design (holed); Lettering: Danmark; value | 1992 |
| | 5 kr. | 28.50 | 2.00 | 9.20 | Cupronickel: Cu: 75%; Ni: 25% | Reeded | Monogram of Frederik X | Traditional design (holed); Lettering: Danmark; value | 1990 |
| | 10 kr. | 23.35 | 2.30 | 7.00 | Aluminium bronze: Cu: 92%; Al: 6%; Ni: 2% | Smooth | Frederik X | Coat of arms; value | 1989 |
| | 20 kr. | 27.00 | 2.35 | 9.30 | Aluminium bronze: Cu: 92%; Al: 6%; Ni: 2% | Interrupted reeding | Frederik X | Coat of arms; value | 1990 |
For table standards, see the coin specification table.

=== Commemoratives and thematic coins ===
The coins of the programme have the same size and metal composition as the regular coins of their denomination.

The first series, 20-krone coins featuring towers in Denmark, ran between 2002 and 2007 and spawned ten different motifs. Upon selecting the towers, importance had been attached not only to display aesthetic towers, but also towers with different form, functions and from different regions of Denmark, the Faroe Islands and Greenland. The last coin depicting the Copenhagen City Hall was issued in June 2007, marking the end of the series. A second series of 20-krone coins, starting in 2007 with twelve different planned motifs and ten already released by November 2011, shows Denmark as a maritime nation in the world, featuring iconic Danish, Faroese and Greenlandic ships and like the previous series of tower coins, the series reflect various landmarks in shipbuilding in the three countries.

In 2005, Danmarks Nationalbank issued the first in a series of five 10-krone commemorative coins with motifs from Hans Christian Andersen's fairy tales. The motifs depicted on the coins were chosen to illustrate various aspects and themes central to the fairy tales with the fifth and final fairy tale coin inspired by The Nightingale being issued on 25 October 2007. In 2007, as the fairy tale series ended, a second series of three 10-krone commemorative coins was introduced, celebrating the International Polar Year. Featuring motifs of a polar bear, the Sirius Sledge Patrol and the Aurora Borealis, the coins aimed to accentuate scientific research in the backdrop of Greenlandic culture and geography. The third and final coin entitled 'Northern Lights' marked the completion of the series in 2009.

== Banknotes ==
Most Danish banknotes (with a few exceptions) issued after 1945 are valid as payment. Banknotes have since 1945 been issued with the values: 5 kroner, 10 kroner, 20 kroner, 50 kroner, 100 kroner, 200 kroner, 500 kroner, and 1000 kroner.

On 30 November 2023, it was announced that all banknotes issued before 2009 would no longer be legal tender as of 31 May 2025. The 1000-kroner banknote was phased out on the same date. Phased out banknotes were accepted by Danmarks Nationalbank until 31 May 2026.

=== 1944 series ===
The 1944 series, known as the substitution series, was developed in secret in 1943−1944 and designed by Danish painter Gerhard Heilmann.

Banknotes of Denmark, 1944 series
| Value | Dimensions (mm) | Main colour | Description | | Issue | Withdrawn | Lapse |
| Value | Dimensions (mm) | Main colour | Obverse | Reverse | Issue | Withdrawn | Lapse |
|---|---|---|---|---|---|---|---|
| 5 kr. | 130 × 72 | Blue | Value | Rosettes, lesser coat of arms | 1945 | 1954 | |
| 10 kr. | 131 × 80 | Orange | Value | Rosettes, lesser coat of arms | 1945 | 1954 | |
| 10 kr. | 130 × 80 | Green | Seaweed | Rosettes, lesser coat of arms | 1947 | 1954 | |
| 50 kr. | 159 × 100 | Purple | Boat with fishermen | Rosettes, lesser coat of arms | 1945 | 31 May 2025 | 31 May 2026 |
| 100 kr. | 159 × 100 | Dark Green | Seaweed decoration, dolphins | Rosettes, lesser coat of arms | 1945 | 31 May 2025 | 31 May 2026 |
| 500 kr. | 174 × 108 | Red | Farmer behind horse-drawn plough | Rosettes, lesser coat of arms | 1945 | 31 May 2025 | 31 May 2026 |
For table standards, see the banknote specification table.

=== 1952 series ===
The 1952 series featured portraits and landscapes, and was issued from 1952 to 1964. It was replaced in 1972. Featuring famous Danes on the obverse and Danish landscapes on the reverse, the banknotes were designed by Gunnar Biilmann Petersen, Gunnar Andersen, and Ib Andersen.

Banknotes of Denmark, 1952 series
| Value | Dimensions (mm) | Main colour | Description | | Issued from | First issued | Withdrawn | Lapse |
| Value | Dimensions (mm) | Main colour | Obverse | Reverse | Issued from | First issued | Withdrawn | Lapse |
|---|---|---|---|---|---|---|---|---|
| 5 kr. | 125 × 65 | Green | Bertel Thorvaldsen; The Three Graces | Kalundborg | 1952–1960 | 14 October 1952 | 31 May 2025 | 31 May 2026 |
| 10 kr. | 125 × 65 | Orange | Hans Christian Andersen; Stork's nest | Egeskov Mill | 1952 | 14 October 1952 | 31 May 2025 | 31 May 2026 |
| 10 kr. | 125 × 71 | Gold | Hans Christian Andersen; Stork's nest | Egeskov Mill | 1954–1974 | 1954 | 31 May 2025 | 31 May 2026 |
| 50 kr. | 153 × 78 | Blue | Ole Rømer; Rundetaarn | Stenvad long barrow | 1957–1970 | 21 May 1957 | 31 May 2025 | 31 May 2026 |
| 100 kr. | 155 × 78 | Red | Hans Christian Ørsted; Compass | Kronborg | 1961–1970 | 3 May 1962 | 31 May 2025 | 31 May 2026 |
| 500 kr. | 175 × 90 | Green | Christian Ditlev Frederik Reventlow; Plough man | Roskilde | 1963–1967 | 2 June 1964 | 31 May 2025 | 31 May 2026 |
For table standards, see the banknote specification table.

=== 1972 series ===
The 1972 series featured portraits and animals, and was issued from 1975 to 1980. It was replaced in 1997. Every note had a portrait based on a painting by Jens Juel on the obverse side. The reverse featured animals designed by Ib Andersen and Gunnar Andersen.

Banknotes of Denmark, 1972 series
| Value | Dimensions (mm) | Main colour | Description | | Issued from | First issued | Withdrawn | Lapse |
| Value | Dimensions (mm) | Main colour | Obverse | Reverse | Issued from | First issued | Withdrawn | Lapse |
|---|---|---|---|---|---|---|---|---|
| 10 kr. | 125 × 67 | Olive | Cathrine Sophie Kirchhoff | Common eider | 1972–1978 | 8 April 1975 | 31 May 2025 | 31 May 2026 |
| 20 kr. | 125 × 72 | Orange | Pauline Maria Tutein | Two house sparrows | 1979–1988 | 11 March 1980 | 31 May 2025 | 31 May 2026 |
| 50 kr. | 139 × 72 | Blue | Engelke Charlotte Ryberg | Crucian carp | 1972–1998 | 21 January 1975 | 31 May 2025 | 31 May 2026 |
| 100 kr. | 150 × 78 | Red | Jens Juel (self-portrait) | Red underwing | 1972–1993 | 22 October 1974 | 31 May 2025 | 31 May 2026 |
| 100 kr. | 150 × 78 | Orange | Jens Juel (self-portrait) | Red underwing | 1994–1998 | 16 October 1995 | 31 May 2025 | 31 May 2026 |
| 500 kr. | 164 × 85 | Green | Unknown (likely Franziska Genoveva von Qualen) | Sand lizard | 1974–1988 | 18 April 1974 | 31 May 2025 | 31 May 2026 |
| 1000 kr. | 176 × 94 | Grey | Thomasine Heiberg | Red squirrel | 1972–1992 | 11 March 1975 | 31 May 2025 | 31 May 2026 |
For table standards, see the banknote specification table.

=== 1997 series ===
The 1997 series features portraits and church art, and was issued from 1997 to 1999. It was replaced in 2009. Illustrated by Johan Alkjær, the banknotes featured portraits of Danish artists and scientists on the obverse while the reverse had motifs of cultural and religious art.

Banknotes of Denmark, 1997 series
| Value | Dimensions (mm) | Main colour | Description | | Issued from | First issued | Withdrawn | Lapse |
| Value | Dimensions (mm) | Main colour | Obverse | Reverse | Issued from | First issued | Withdrawn | Lapse |
|---|---|---|---|---|---|---|---|---|
| 50 kr. | 125 × 72 | Purple | Karen Blixen | Centaur (Landet Church, Tåsinge) | 1999–2002; 2004–2007 | 7 May 1999 | 31 May 2025 | 31 May 2026 |
| 100 kr. | 135 × 72 | Golden orange | Carl Nielsen | Basilisk (Tømmeby Church, Hanherred) | 1999–2001; 2002–2008 | 22 November 1999 | 31 May 2025 | 31 May 2026 |
| 200 kr. | 145 × 72 | Green | Johanne Luise Heiberg | Lion (Viborg Cathedral) | 1997–2000; 2003–2008 | 10 March 1997 | 31 May 2025 | 31 May 2026 |
| 500 kr. | 155 × 72 | Blue | Niels Bohr | Knight fighting a dragon (Lihme Church) | 1997–2003; 2003–2008 | 12 September 1997 | 31 May 2025 | 31 May 2026 |
| 1000 kr. | 165 × 72 | Red | Anna and Michael Ancher | Tournament scene (Bislev Church) | 1998; 2004–2006 | 18 September 1998 | 31 May 2025 | 31 May 2026 |
For table standards, see the banknote specification table.

=== 2009 series ===
The process of designing the 'Bridge' banknotes was initiated in 2006 by Danmarks Nationalbank. The theme of the new banknotes is Danish bridges and the surrounding landscapes, or details from these landscapes. Danish artist Karin Birgitte Lund has chosen to interpret this theme in two ways: bridges as links between various parts of Denmark and as links between the past and the present. The present is represented by the bridges, the past by five distinctive prehistoric objects found near the bridges. Among the new security features is a window thread ("Motion") with a moving wave pattern. Another feature is a new, sophisticated hologram that reflects light in different colors. The new banknotes also have the traditional security features such as the watermark and the hidden security thread.

Banknotes of Denmark, 2009 series
| Image | | Value | Dimensions (mm) | Main colour | Description | | Issued from | First issued | Withdrawn | Lapse |
| Obverse | Reverse | Value | Dimensions (mm) | Main colour | Obverse | Reverse | Issued from | First issued | Withdrawn | Lapse |
|---|---|---|---|---|---|---|---|---|---|---|
| | | 50 kr. | 125 × 72 | Violet | Sallingsund Bridge | Skarpsalling vessel | 2009 | 11 August 2009 | Current | |
| | | 100 kr. | 135 × 72 | Orange-yellow | Little Belt Bridge | Hindsgavl Dagger | 2010 | 4 May 2010 | Current | |
| | | 200 kr. | 145 × 72 | Green | Knippelsbro | Langstrup belt plate | 2010 | 19 October 2010 | Current | |
| | | 500 kr. | 155 × 72 | Blue | Queen Alexandrine Bridge | Keldby bronze pail | 2011 | 15 February 2011 | Current | |
| | | 1000 kr. | 165 × 72 | Red | Great Belt Bridge | Trundholm sun chariot | 2011 | 24 May 2011 | 31 May 2025 | 31 May 2026 |
For table standards, see the banknote specification table.

Starting in 2020, Danmarks Nationalbank released a new version of the 500-kroner banknote with updated security features, the first in the 2009A series. Updated versions of the 50-, 100-, and 200-kroner banknotes are scheduled to enter circulation in 2024–2025.

=== 2028 series ===
The next series of banknotes is scheduled for release in 2028 and will not contain a 1000-krone banknote, which is no longer be legal tender as of 31 May 2025, with that banknote being withdrawn in order to combat and prevent money laundering. Banknotes from the new series and the 2009 series will co-circulate for a period of time and eventually only the new series of banknotes will be legal tender. The design process started in the spring of 2024, and they are scheduled to be finalised in early 2026. In September 2024, it was announced that the obverse of the banknotes would feature "important achievements and the people behind them" whereas the reverse will feature the sea as a motif. The selected achievements and people are as follows:

- Fairy tales and Hans Christian Andersen
- Astronomy and Tycho Brahe
- The Earth's core and Inge Lehmann
- The Thule Expedition and Arnarulunnguaq

== Exchange rates ==
Cost of one Euro in Danish krone (from 1999)

=== Current DKK exchange rates ===
| From Google Finance: | AUD CAD CHF CNY EUR GBP HKD JPY USD NOK SEK |
| From Yahoo! Finance: | AUD CAD CHF CNY EUR GBP HKD JPY USD NOK SEK |
| From XE.com: | AUD CAD CHF CNY EUR GBP HKD JPY USD NOK SEK |
| From OANDA: | AUD CAD CHF CNY EUR GBP HKD JPY USD NOK SEK |

== See also ==
- Denmark and the euro
- Economy of Denmark
- Economy of the Faroe Islands
- Economy of Greenland
