= Face value =

Nominal value of a currency given by the issuing authority

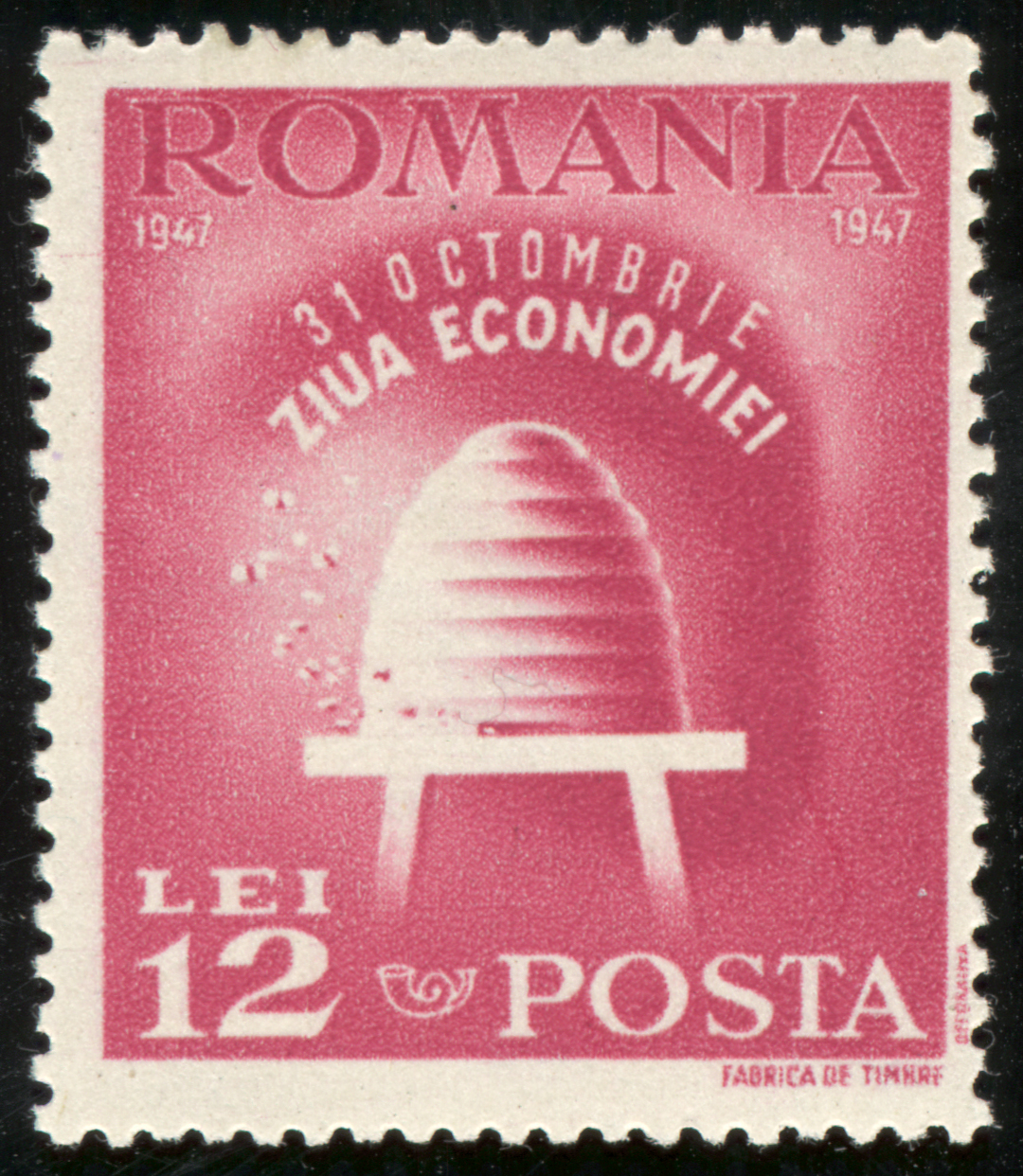
A Romanian stamp from 1947 showing a face value of 12 Lei

The face value, which is also called the nominal value, is the value as printed by the relevant issuing authority on a coin, banknote, bond, or stamp.

== Currency and stamps ==
The face value of coins, banknotes, and stamps is usually its legal value. However, their market value need not bear any relationship to the face value. For example, some rare coins or stamps may be traded at prices considerably above their face value. Coins may also have a salvage value due to more or less valuable metals that they contain.

== Bonds ==
The face value of bonds usually represents the principal or redemption value. Interest payments are expressed as a percentage of face value. Before maturity, the actual value of a bond may be greater or less than face value, depending on the interest rate payable and the perceived risk of default. As bonds approach maturity, actual value approaches face value.

== Share certificates ==
In the case of stock certificates, face value is the par value of the stock. In the case of common stock, par value is largely symbolic and may be omitted entirely (no-par common stock). In the case of preferred stock, dividends may be expressed as a percentage of par value.

== Insurance ==
The face value of a life insurance policy is the death benefit. In the case of so-called "double indemnity" life insurance policies, the beneficiary receives double the face value in case of accidental death.

The face value of property, casualty or health insurance policies is the maximum amount payable, as stated on the policy's face or declarations page.

== Tickets ==
Face value also refers to the price printed on a ticket to a sporting event, concert, or other event (the price the ticket was originally sold for by the organization hosting the event). The practice of re-selling tickets for more than face value (or a certain amount above face value) is commonly known as ticket scalping.

== Abstract ideas ==
Face value can be used to refer to a concept or plan. In this context, "face value" refers to the apparent merits of the idea, before the concept or plan has been tested.

== Colloquial use ==
Taking someone at face value is assuming another person's suggestion, offer, or proposal is sincere, rather than a bargaining ploy.

== In art ==
Face Value (album) is a debut studio album by the English drummer and singer-songwriter Phil Collins, released on 13 February 1981.

== See also ==
- Denomination (currency)
- Denomination (postage stamp)
- Gresham's law
- Nominal value
- Par value
- Place value
- Token money
