= List of bullion coins =

Bullion coins or investment coins are coins made of precious metals, usually gold or silver, but possibly platinum, palladium, or rhodium. They are kept as a store of value or an investment with no (or little) value beyond that of their precious metal content.

Under United Kingdom law, a gold coin is considered to be an investment coin, and hence transactions in it are not subject to value-added tax (VAT), if it is minted after 1800, and at least 900 thousandths fine, and has been legal tender in its country of origin, and not normally sold at more than 180% of the value of its precious metal content; or if it is on a long list of coins deemed to be investment coins. Under United States law, coins that do not meet the legal tender requirement cannot be marketed as "coins". Instead, they must be advertised as rounds.

Bullion coins are typically available in various weights, usually multiples or fractions of 1 troy ounce, but some bullion coins are produced in very limited quantities in kilograms or heavier.

== Gold ==
| Country | Name of bullion coin | Fineness | Weights options in troy ounces (ozt) | 1 oz mintage (2018) | Years minted |
|---|---|---|---|---|---|
| Australia | Gold Nugget | .9999 | 1/20, 1/10, 1/4, 1/2, 1; 2, 10, 1kg, 1000kg | 188,921 | 1986–present 1991–present |
| Australia | Dragon Rectangular Coin | .9999 | 1 | 1,888 | 2018–present |
| Austria | Vienna Philharmonic | .9999 | 1/25, 1/10, 1/4, 1/2, 1 | 318,300 | 1989–present |
| Canada | Maple Leaf | .9999 | 1/20, 1/15, 1/10, 1/5, 1/4, 1/2, 1, 100 kg | | 1979–present |
| China | Gold Panda | .999 | (since 2016) 1g, 3g, 5g, 8g, 15g, 30g, 50g, 100g, 150g | 700,000 | 1982–present |
| Iran | Emami | .900 | 2g, 4g, 8.13g | | 1980–present |
| Isle of Man | Angel | .999 | 1/20, 1/10, 1/4, 1/2, 1, 5, 10 | | 1984–present |
| Israel | Jerusalem of Gold Series | .9999 | 1 | 3,600 | 2010–present |
| Malaysia | Kijang Emas | .9999 | 1/4, 1/2, 1 | | 2001–present |
| Malta | Melita | .999 | 1/10, 1/4, 1/2, 1 | | 2018–present |
| Mexico | Libertad | .900 | 1/4, 1/2, 1 | | 1981–90 |
| Mexico | Libertad | .999 | 1/20, 1/10, 1/4, 1/2, 1 | | 1991–present |
| Mexico | Centenario | .900 | 1.20565 (weight 41.67 gr. for 37.5 gr. of pure gold) | | 1921–31, 1943–47, 1949–72*, 1996*, 2000-09* *dated 1947 |
| New Zealand | Kiwi | .9999 | 1/10, 1/4, 1/2, 1 | 500 | 1990–present |
| Poland | Orzeł bielik (Polish White-tailed Eagle) | .9999 | 1/10, 1/4, 1/2, 1 | 1,500 (2019) | 1995–present except for 2001, 2003 and 2005 |
| Russia | George the Victorious | .999 | 7.89g | 150,000 | 2006–present |
| Singapore | Lion | .9999 | 1/20, 1/10, 1/4, 1/2, 1 | | 1990-2002 |
| Somalia | Elephant | .999 | 1/50, 1/25, 1, 5 | | 2004–present |
| South Africa | Krugerrand | .9167 | 1/20, 1/10, 1/4, 1/2, 1 | | 1967–present |
| South Africa | Big 5 | .9999 | 1/4, 1, 5, 1kg | | 2019-present |
| Spain | Iberian Lynx | .9999 | 1 | | 2021-Present |
| Ukraine | Archangel Michael | .9999 | 1/10, 1/4, 1/2, 1 | 1,500 | 2011–2023 |
| United Kingdom | Sovereign | .9167 | 0.2354 | | 1887–1932, 1949–52 (dated 1925), 1957–59; 1962–68, 1974, 1976, 1978–82, 2000–present |
| United Kingdom | Britannia | .9167 | 1/10, 1/4, 1/2, 1 | | 1987–2012 |
| United Kingdom | Britannia | .9999 | 1/40 1/20, 1/10, 1/4, 1/2, 1 | | 2013–present |
| United States | Gold Eagle | .9167 | 1/10, 1/4, 1/2, 1 | 191,000 | 1986–present |
| United States | American Buffalo | .9999 | 1 | 121,000 | 2006–present |

== Palladium ==
| Country | Name of bullion coin | Fineness | weights options in troy ounces (ozt) | Years Minted |
|---|---|---|---|---|
| Australia | Emu | .9995 | 1 ozt | 1995–1998 |
| Canada | Palladium Maple Leaf | .9995 | 1 ozt | 2005–2010 |
| China | Panda | .999 | .5 ozt | 1989, 2004, 2005 |
| Portugal | Columbus | .9995 | 1 ozt | 1987–2000 |
| Russia | Ballerina | .9995 | 1 ozt | 1989–1995 |
| United States | Palladium Eagle | .9995 | 1 ozt | 2017–present |

== Platinum ==
| Country | Name of bullion coin | Fineness | weights options in troy ounces (ozt) | 1oz Mintage (2018) | Years Minted |
|---|---|---|---|---|---|
| Australia | Platinum Koala | .9995 | 1/20, 1/10, 1/4, 1/2, 1 | 2,048 (2008) | 1988–2008 |
| Australia | Platinum Platypus | .9995 | 1 | 2,994 (2017) | 2011–2017 |
| Australia | Platinum Kangaroo | .9995 | 1 | 5,251 | 2018–present |
| Austria | Vienna Philharmonic | .9995 | 1/25, 1 | 13,800 | 2016–present |
| Canada | Platinum Maple Leaf | .9995 | 1/20, 1/15, 1/10, 1/4, 1/2, 1 | | 1988–99, 2002, 2009–present |
| Isle of Man | Noble | .9995 | 1/20, 1/10, 1/4, 1/2, 1 | | 1983–1989, 2016 |
| United Kingdom | Britannia | .9995 | 1/10, 1 | | 2018–present |
| United States | Platinum Eagle | .9995 | 1/10, 1/4, 1/2, 1 | 30,000 | 1997–present |

== Rhodium ==
| Country | Name of bullion coin | Fineness | Weight | Mintage | Mint | Years Minted |
|---|---|---|---|---|---|---|
| Tuvalu | South Sea Dragon | .999 | 1 ozt | 1,000 | Baird & Co | 2018 |

== Silver ==
=== Annual releases ===
| Country | Name of bullion coin | Fineness | weights options in troy ounces (ozt) | 1ozt Mintage (2018)(*2021-2022*) | Years Minted |
|---|---|---|---|---|---|
| Antigua and Barbuda | Frigatebird | .999 | 1 | *25,000* | 2021–Present |
| Armenia | Noah's Ark | .999 | 1/4, 1/2, 1, 5, 10, 1 kg, 5 kg | 234,001 | 2011–present |
| Australia | Red Kangaroo | .9999 | 1 | 4,395,517 | 2015–present |
| Australia | Kookaburra | .999 | 1, 2, 10, 1 kg | 4,395,517 | 1990–present |
| Australia | Koala | .999 | 1, 1 kg | 166,434 | 2007–present |
| Australia | Dragon | .999 | 1 | 3,888 | 2018–present |
| Austria | Vienna Philharmonic | .999 | 1 | 2,101,592 | 2008–present |
| Bhutan | Bhutan Lunar | .999 | 1 | 50,000 | 2016–present |
| Cambodia | Cambodia Lost Tiger | .999 | 1 | 10,000 | 2022–present |
| Cameroon | Cameroon Mandrill | .999 | 1 | 10,000 | 2018–present |
| Canada | Maple Leaf | .9999 | 1/2, 1 | | 1988–present |
| China | Silver Panda | Varies | Varies | 10,000,000 | 1989–present |
| Congo (Democratic Republic of) | World's Wildlife | .999 | 1 | 30,000 | 2019–present |
| Congo (Republic) | Silverback Gorilla | .999 | 1 | 75,000 | 2015–present |
| Cook Islands | HMS Bounty | .9999 | 1, 2 | (1) 15,000 (2) 6,500 | 2020 |
| Equatorial Guinea | Giraffe | .999 | 1 | 15,000 | 2022–present |
| Gibraltar | Lady Justice | .999 | 1 | 15,000 | 2022–present |
| Ghana | African Leopard | .999 | 1 | (1) 10,000 | 2019–present |
| Isle of Man | Angel | .999 | 1 | 15,000 | 1995–2018 |
| Isle of Man | Domestic cats | .999 | 1 | 10,000 | 1998–2018 |
| Isle of Man | Noble | .999 | 1 | 30,000 | 1994–2018 |
| Kazakhstan | Snow Leopard | .999 | 1 | (1) 10,000 | 2009–present |
| Laos | Tiger (Panthera Tigris) | .999 | 1 | (1) 10,000 | 2020–present |
| Malta | Melita | .999 | 10 | | 2021–present |
| Mexico | Libertad | .999 | 1/20, 1/10, 1/4, 1/2, 1, 2, 5, 1 kg | 300,000, (2,458,000 in 1992) | 1982–present |
| Mexico | Onza Troy | .925 | 1 (weight 33.625 gr.) | 6,104,000 (1980) | 1949, 1978–1980 |
| New Zealand | Kiwi | .999 | 1, 5 | 10,000 | 1990–present |
| Niue/Fiji | Taku/Turtle | .999 | 1, 2, 5 | 350,000 | 2010–present |
| Papua New Guinea | Birds of Paradise | .999 | 1 | 10,000 | 2022–present |
| Russia | Saint George the Victorious | .999 | 1 | 250,000 | 2009–present |
| Rwanda | African Ounce | .999 | 1 | | 2008–present |
| Serbia | Nikola Tesla | .999 | 1 | 50,000 | 2018–present |
| Somalia | Elephant | .9999 | 1/10, 1/4, 1/2, 1, 2, 5, 10, 1 kg | | 2004–present |
| South Africa | Krugerrand | .999 | 1 | 630,000 (2017) | 2017–present |
| South Korea | Chiwoo Cheonwang | .999 | 1/2, 1, 2, 10 | 35,000 | 2016–present |
| Ukraine | Archangel Michael | .9999 | 1 | 40,000 | 2011–present |
| United Kingdom | Britannia | .958 | 1/10, 1/4, 1/2, 1 | N/A | 1997–2012 |
| United Kingdom | Britannia | .999 | 1 | | 2013–present |
| United States | Silver Eagle | .999 | 1 | 15,700,000 | 1986–present |

=== Limited series ===
| Country | Name of bullion coin | Mint | weights options in troy ounces (ozt) | Mintage | Years Minted | # of coins |
|---|---|---|---|---|---|---|
| Australia | Lunar series | Perth Mint | 1/2, 1, 2, 5, 10, 10 kg | 300,000 | 2008–2019 | 12 |
| Barbados | Trident | Scottsdale Mint | 1 | 30,000 | 2017–2020 | 4 |
| Canada | Wildlife series | Royal Canadian Mint | 1 | 1,000,000 | 2011–2013 | 6 |
| South Korea | ZI:SIN (Twelve Guardians) | KOMSCO | 1 | 10,000-40,000 | 2017–2028 | 12 |
| Tokelau | Sea creatures | Highland Mint | 1, 2, 5, 10, 1 kg | | 2014–2025 | 12 |
| Ukraine | To the 30th anniversary of Ukrainian independence | National Bank of Ukraine Mint | 1 | 15,000 | 2021 | 1 |
| United Kingdom | The Queen's Beasts | Royal Mint | 1, 2, 5, 10, 1 kg | | 2017–2021 | 12 |
| United States | America the Beautiful | United States Mint | 5 | 20,000-126,700 | 2010–2021 | 56 |

== Gallery ==
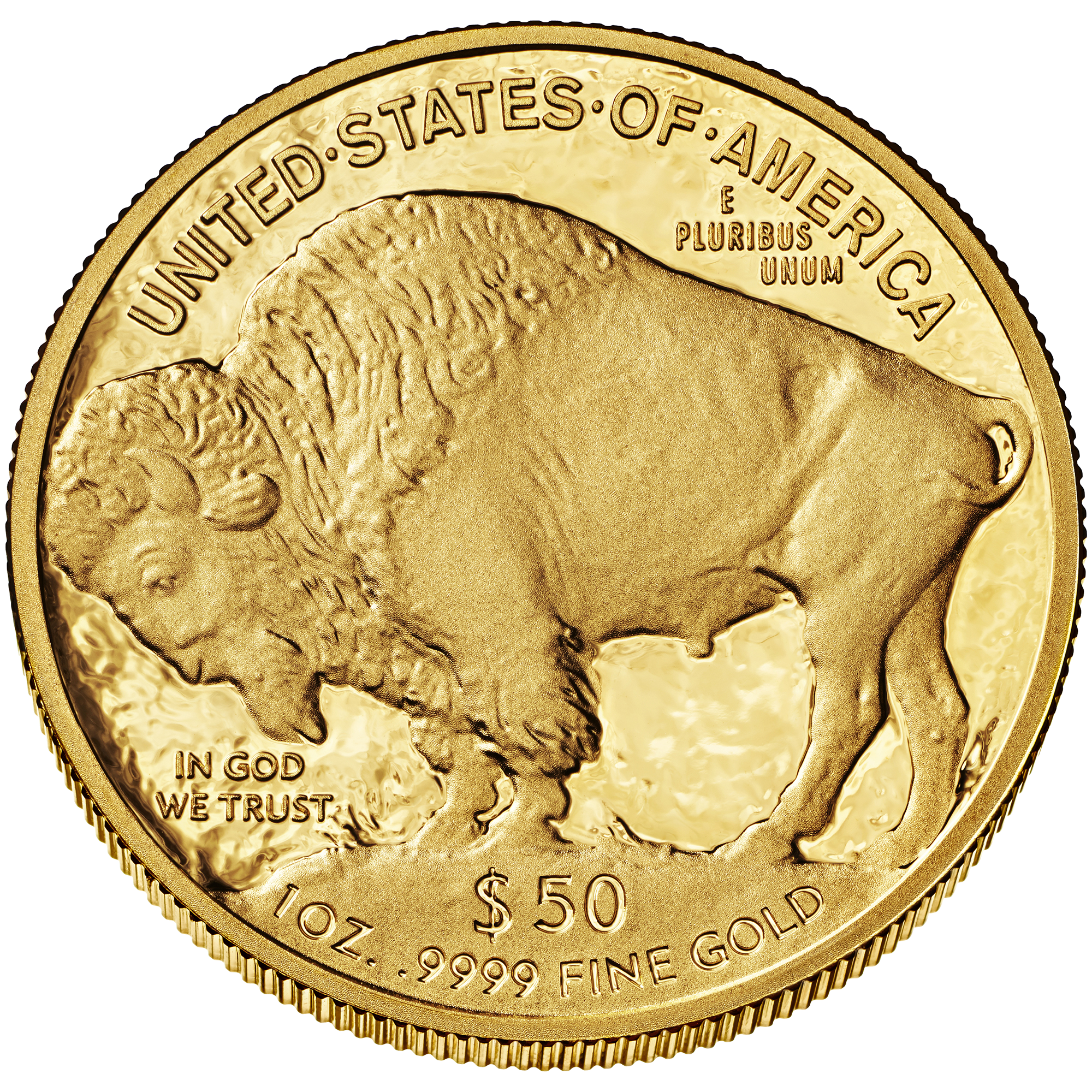
Reverse of a gold American Buffalo coin

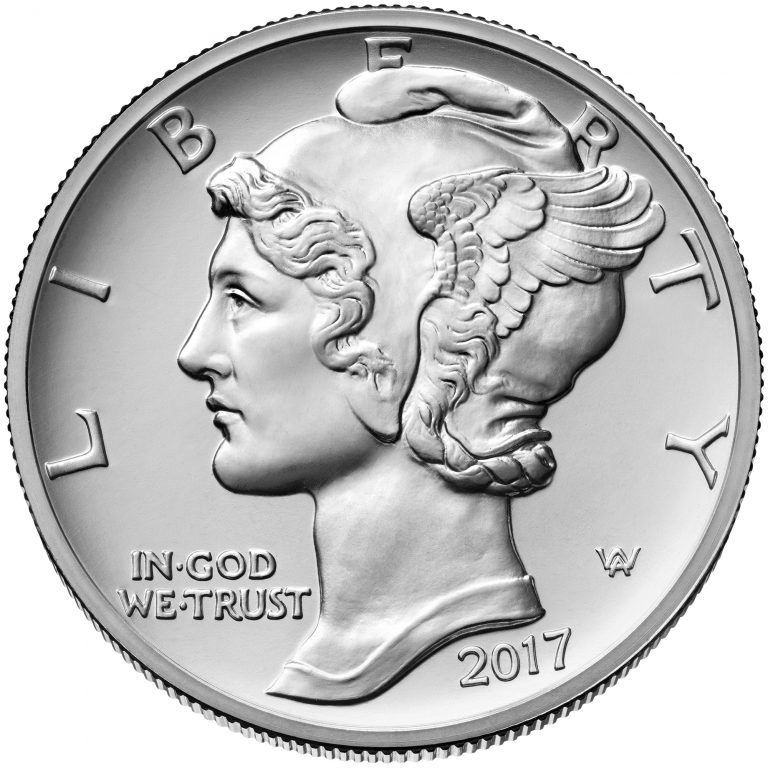
Obverse of an American Palladium Eagle coin

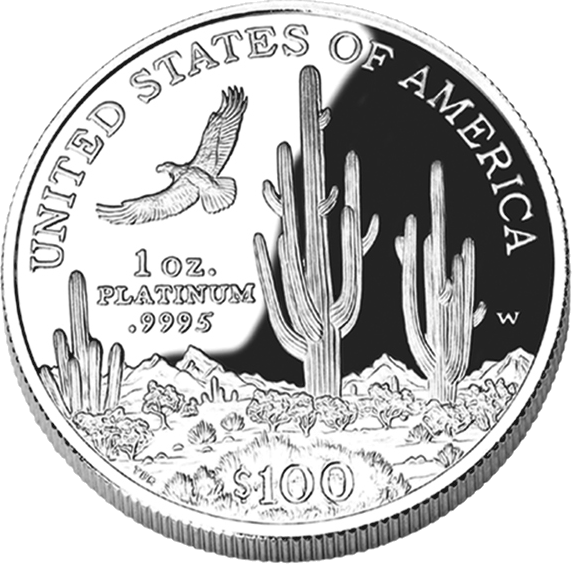
Reverse of an American Platinum Eagle proof coin

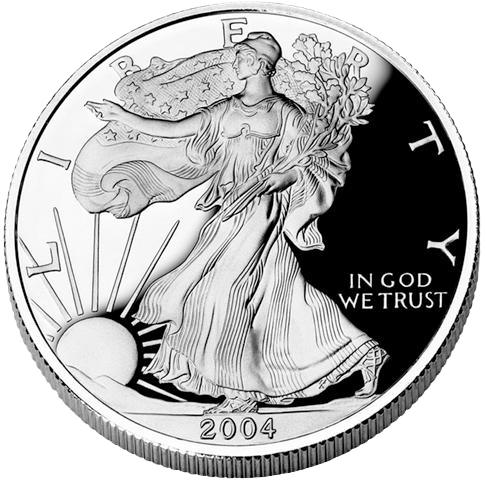
Obverse of a 2004 American Silver Eagle

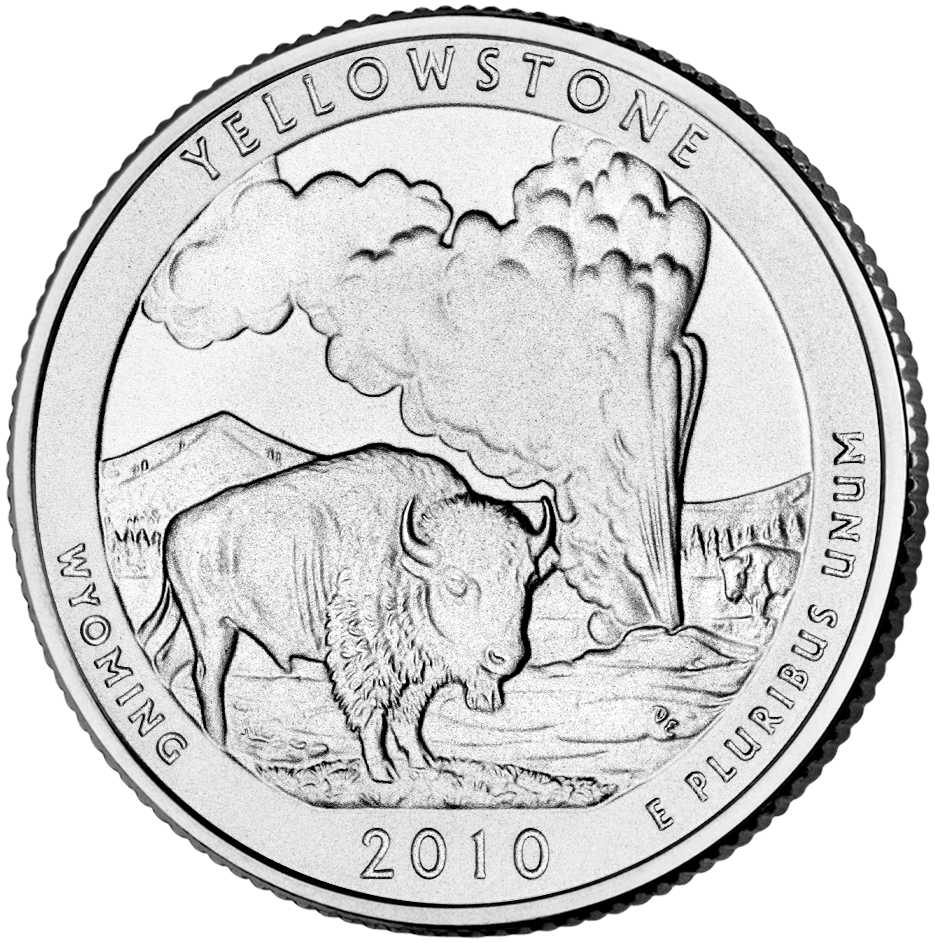
Reverse of a 2010 limited series America the Beautiful coin
