= List of acts of the Parliament of Western Australia from 1987 =

This is a list of acts of the Parliament of Western Australia for the year 1987.

== 1987 ==
Short title, or popular name	Citation	Royal assent
Long title
Electoral Act (Commencement of Amendments) Act 1987	No. 1 of 1987	20 May 1987
An Act to provide for the commencement of the Electoral Amendment Act (No. 2) 1985 (Note: Electoral Amendment Act (No. 2) 1985 (No. 104)) and for incidental and other purposes.
Rottnest Island Authority Act 1987	No. 91 of 1987	9 December 1987
An Act to establish an Authority to control and manage Rottnest Island, to provide for the management policies to be followed by the Authority, to dissolve the Rottnest Island Board, and for connected purposes.
Gold Banking Corporation Act 1987 or the Gold Corporation Act 1987	No. 99 of 1987	18 December 1987
An Act to constitute the Gold Banking Corporation and provide for its functions and the conduct of its business, to preserve and continue the Western Australian Mint and constitute GoldCorp Australia as subsidiaries of Gold Banking Corporation and provide for their functions and the conduct of their businesses, to repeal the Western Australian Mint Act 1970 (Note: Perth Mint Act 1970 (No. 23)) and for related purposes.
	No. X of 1987	
Acts Amendment (Imprisonment and Parole) Act 1987	No. 129 of 1987	21 January 1988
An Act to amend the Offenders Probation and Parole Act 1963, (Note: Offenders Probation and Parole Act 1963 (No. 23)) the Prisons Act 1981, (Note: Prisons Act 1981 (No. 115)) The Criminal Code, the Offenders Probation and Parole Amendment Act 1983, (Note: Offenders Probation and Parole Amendment Act 1983 (No. 68)) and the Parole Orders (Transfer) Act 1984, (Note: Parole Orders (Transfer) Act 1984 (No. 45)) and for related purposes.

== Sources ==
- "legislation.wa.gov.au".
