= Dragon Rectangular Coin =

- Australia
- Value: 1.00 Australian dollar (Silver, face value); 100 Australian dollars (Gold, face value)
- Mass: 31.103 g (1.00 troy oz)
- Diameter: 27.6 (Silver) mm (1.08 in)
- Edge: Flat
- Composition: 99.99% Ag; 99.99% Au
- Years of minting: 2018-present

Obverse
- Design: Bust of Queen Elizabeth II (2018-2023); Bust of King Charles III (2024-present)
- Designer: Jody Clark (2018-2023); Dan Thorne (2024-present)
- Design date: 2018; 2024

Reverse
- Design: Chinese dragon

The Dragon Rectangular Coin is a bullion coin produced by the Perth Mint since 2018. Resembling a cross between conventional gold and silver coins and gold and silver bars, the silver coin has a face value of one Australian dollar, while the gold version has a face value of one hundred Australian dollars. Unlike other bullion coins, which are .999 fine silver, both versions are 0.9999 fine, and weigh exactly one troy ounce. A maximum of 250,000 Uncirculated silver coins, and 3,888 Proof maximum mintage are produced each year.
