= Ukrainian Archangel Michael coins =

Ukrainian silver and gold bullion coins

Silver Archangel Michael
- Ukraine
- Value: 1 hryvnia (face value)
- Mass: 31.1 g (1.0 troy oz)
- Diameter: 38.61 mm (1.52 in)
- Thickness: 3.0 mm (0.12 in)
- Composition: 99.99% Ag
- Years of minting: 2011-present

Obverse
- Design: Shield with the emblem of the National Bank of Ukraine. Above it is the coat of arms of Ukraine.
- Design used: 2011-2019
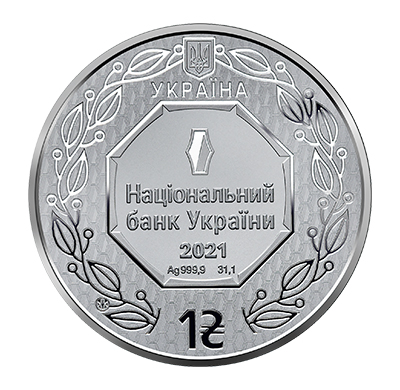
- Design: Emblem of the National Bank of Ukraine, and the year of minting.
- Design used: 2020-date

Reverse
- Design: Archangel Michael

The Archangel Michael are silver and gold bullion coins originating from Ukraine and minted by the National Bank of Ukraine.

== Design ==
Obverse: The coat of arms of Ukraine and the inscription "НАЦІОНАЛЬНИЙ БАНК УКРАЇНИ" (National Bank of Ukraine) are at the top of the coin. Inside an octagonal cartouche at the centre is a shield with the emblem of the National Bank of Ukraine. At the bottom of the coin, it is inscribed in Ukrainian the value of the coin. On the one-ounce silver coin, it is inscribed with "ОДНА ГРИВНЯ" (one hryvnia).

Reverse: Depicted is the Taxiarch Archangel Michael. He is depicted here as a warrior, wearing full armor and holding a sword in his right hand. There is the circular inscription "…ЗА НАС І ДУШІ ПРАВЕДНИХ, І СИЛА АРХІСТРАТИГА МИХАЇЛА". Which translates into "...For us and souls of righteous men, and Archistrategos Michael's strength", from Taras Shevchenko's Ukrainian poem Haydamaky.

== Specifications ==
Specifications
Composition	Weight (troy oz)	Face Value	Diameter (mm)	Thickness (mm)
Silver	1	1 Hryvnia	38.6	3.0
Gold	1/10	2 Hryvnia	16.0	1.1
Gold	1/4	5 Hryvnia	20.0	1.6
Gold	1/2	10 Hryvnia	25.0	2.0
Gold	1	20 Hryvnia	32.0	2.4

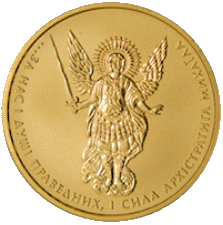
Reverse of the gold coins

== Mintage ==
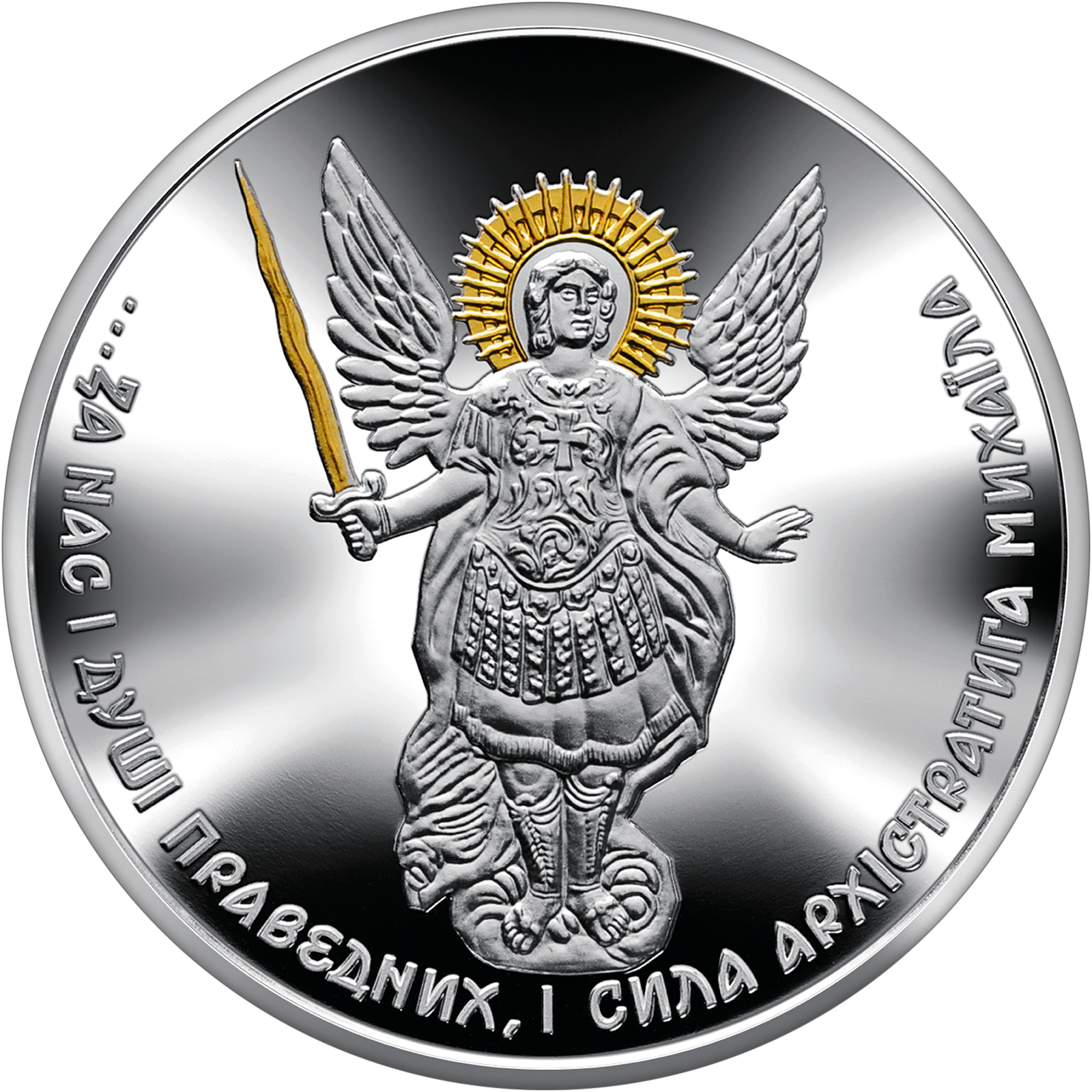
The 2023 gold-coloured 1 oz silver coin

Mintages for Archangel Michael coins
Year	Silver	Gold			
Year	1 oz	1/10 oz	1/4 oz	1/2 oz	1 oz
2011	10,000	-	3,000	-	1,500
2012	20,000	8,000	3,500	3,700	5,900
2013	24,500	6,600	5,300	4,500	4,000
2014	24,705	5,000	3,800	3,800	6,400
2015	26,990	7,500	7,500	3,000	3,000
2016	20,000	2,000	2,000	10,000	10,000
2017	30,000	-	-	-	-
2017P	10,000	-	-	-	-
2018	40,000	-	-	-	1,500
2019	25,000	-	-	-	-
2020	31,000	2,000	-	-	-
2021	20,000	2,500	-	-	-
2022	10,000	-	-	-	-
2022G	5,000	-	-	-	-
2023	N/A	-	-	-	-
2023G	5,000	-	-	-	-
P indicates Silver Proof issue.
G indicates the gold-coloured issues.

In 2022, some 1 oz silver coins were made where on the obverse, the body of Archangel Michael is colored in gold. This continued in 2023, but this time, only his sword and halo were coloured.

== See also ==
- Angel, a similar bullion coin distributed by the Isle of Man, also featuring Michael
- Gold Angel, an English medieval gold coin depicting Michael slaying a dragon on its obverse
- Bullion
- Bullion coin
- Gold as an investment
- Inflation hedge
- Silver as an investment
