= Bielik =

Bielik is a Slavic surname. Notable people with the surname include:

- Bea Bielik (born 1980), American tennis player
- Július Bielik (born 1962), Slovak footballer
- Krystian Bielik (born 1998), Polish footballer
- Mária Bieliková (born 1966), Slovak computer scientist
- Paľo Bielik (1910–1983), Slovak film director, screenwriter and actor
- Peter Bielik, Slovak historian

See also

- Margański & Mysłowski EM-10 Bielik, Polish military training aircraft prototype
- ORP Bielik (2003), a Kobben-class submarine acquired in 2003
- Orzeł bielik, gold coins
