= Australian Silver Kangaroo (bullion) =

One troy ounce silver coin

Silver Kangaroo
- Australia
- Value: 1 Dollar (face value)
- Mass: 31.1 g (1.0 troy oz)
- Diameter: 40.6 mm (1.52 in)
- Thickness: 3.2 mm (0.13 in)
- Edge: Reeded
- Composition: 99.99% Ag
- Years of minting: 2015-present

Obverse
- Design: Queen Elizabeth II
- Designer: Jody Clark
- Design date: 2015

Reverse
- Design: Red kangaroo jumping
- Designer: Dr. Stuart Devlin
- Design date: 2014

The Silver Kangaroo is a silver coin originating from Australia and produced at the Perth Mint. This is a bullion coin meant for investment in silver. An Australian silver kangaroo coin, produced at the Royal Australian Mint (RAM), is collected for its numismatic value. The obverse of the coin always depicts Queen Elizabeth II. The reverse side features a red kangaroo jumping. Unlike the Australian silver koala and silver kookaburra coins, the reverse image does not change every year. The obverse image on the RAM silver coin does change every year. The mintage every year is unlimited, unlike the koala and kookaburra coins which have a maximum mintage of 300,000 and 500,000 respectively. No special editions or privy marks have appeared for the one-ounce bullion coin.

Special editions such as proof, colored, and gilded are also available.

Mintage figures
Year	Mintage
2015	300,000
2016	11,245,615
2017	5,178,016
2018	4,395,517
2019	5,650,501
2020	13,169,939
2021	11,735,394

== See also ==
- Australian Silver Koala
- Australian Silver Kookaburra
- Bullion
- Bullion coin
- Inflation hedge
- Silver as an investment
