= Kijang =

Kijang may refer to

- Kijang county, located between Haeundae-gu and Ulsan in northern Busan, South Korea
- Kijang (state constituency), a state constituency in Kelantan, Malaysia
- Kijang Emas, the official gold bullion coin of Malaysia
- Raja Haji Fisabilillah International Airport, an international airport located in Tanjungpinang, Riau Islands, Indonesia, formerly called Kijang Airport
- Toyota Kijang, an automobile model from Toyota
