= Pobjoy Mint =

Private mint in Surrey, UK

Pobjoy Mint Ltd.
- Company type: Private limited company
- Industry: Precious metals production
- Founded: 1965
- Founder: Derek Pobjoy
- Defunct: 2023
- Headquarters: Tadworth, Surrey, United Kingdom
- Area served: Worldwide
- Key people: Managing Director -Taya Pobjoy (last)
- Products: Non-circulating legal tender commemorative coins, circulating coinage, medals and medallions, tokens
- Website: Pobjoy Mint

British Pobjoy Mint was a privately held company-sector mint located in Surrey, England, which produced commemorative coins, medal, tokens, and bullion. The mint also manufactured circulating currency for some British Overseas Territories and sovereign countries including Sierra Leone and Malaysia.

== History ==
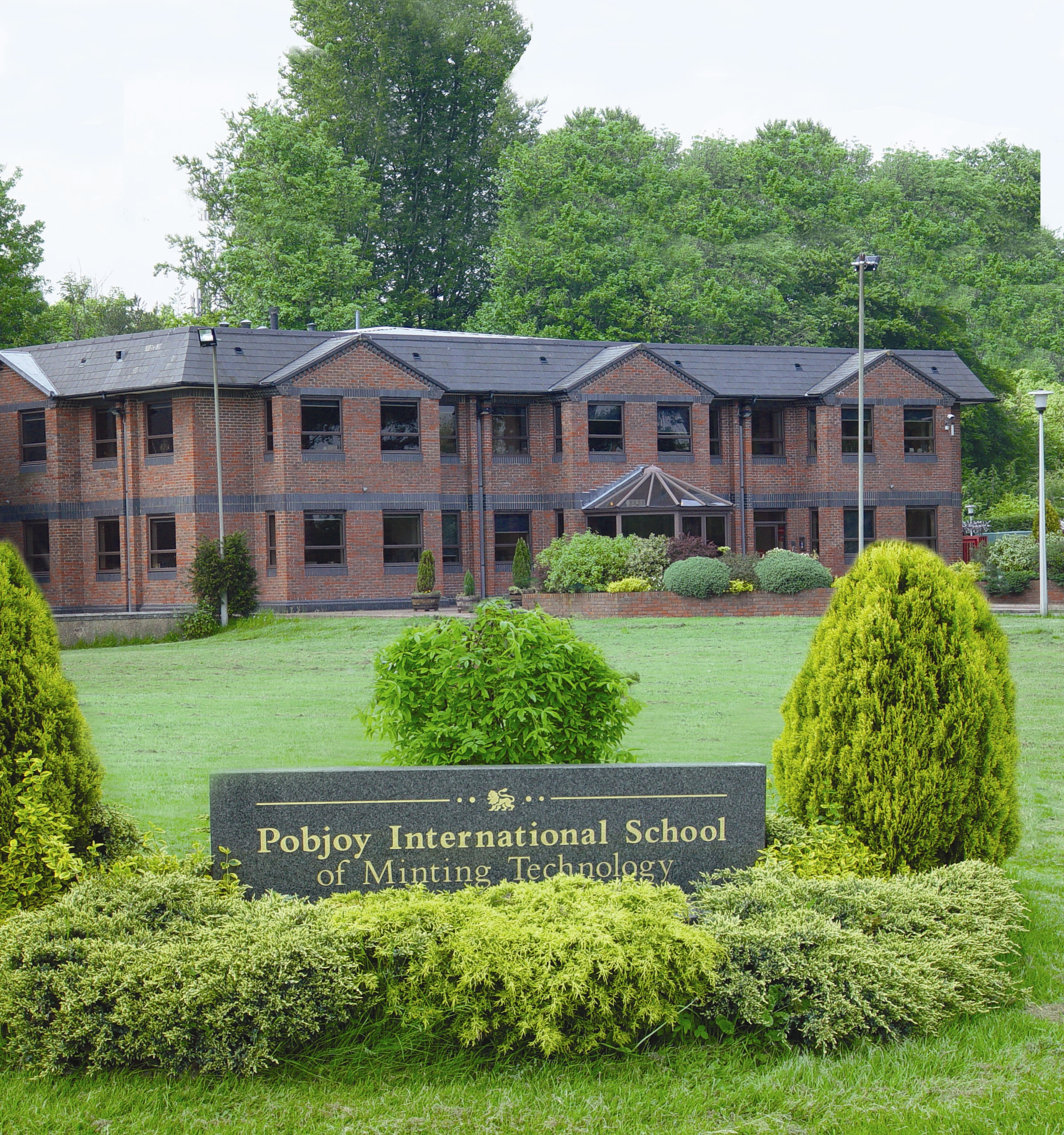
Pobjoy Mint

The mint was founded in 1965 by Derek Pobjoy who purchased a coin press after leaving his father Ernest Pobjoy's jewellery and masonry business to set up a mint. Upon the death of Winston Churchill in the same year, the small mint produced a series of gold medals to commemorate coins.

Since 1974, the mint had become involved in the production and international sale of new-issue postage stamps and exclusively coordinated the coin and stamp programmes of seven territories (Ascension Island, Bahamas, British Antarctic Territory, British Virgin Islands, Falkland Islands, South Georgia and South Sandwich Islands, and Tristan da Cunha).

As manufacturers of gold chains, gilt and enamel badges and escutcheons, regalia, and insignia of all kinds, the Pobjoy Mint had been contractor to the British Crown Agents and various London jewellers, for whom it had executed commissions involving precious metals and gemstones of all kinds.

On 12 October 2023, the current Director Taya Pobjoy announced during a podcast with Coin World, a numismatic publication in the US, both her retirement and the closure of the Mint in its entirety. The mint's website remained open for orders until its close in November 2023 with no further coins dated '2024'.

== Numismatic developments ==
In the 1970s, the company developed a new metal alloy similar to German silver known as Virenium, which consisted of 81% copper, 10% zinc, and 9% nickel. This alloy had been used in non-circulating commemoratives since 1978.

In 1983, the company also created the Manx noble, a bullion coin containing one troy ounce of platinum. It was the first investment coin to be made from 0.9995 fine platinum. Its production ran for six years from 1983 to 1989. The noble has legal tender status although, like the South African gold Krugerrand, its value is defined only by its precious metal content as it has no numismatic value.

The mint also produced the Isle of Man's angel gold coin, from 1984 to 2016. In 1999, Pobjoy Mint issued the world's first titanium coin, the 1999 Gibraltar Millennium £5 coin.

== Countries and governments ==
The Pobjoy Mint had struck non-circulating (commemorative), circulating, and pattern coins for nearly 20% of the world's governments and central banks as well as undertaking subcontracted work for certain national mints. Many medallion issues have also been produced, notably for Hong Kong, Malaysia, and the Arab States. The mint has produced eighty different medallions for the World Wide Fund for Nature collection.

The mint has struck coins for the following territories

- Ascension Island
- Bolivia
- (Bosnia and Herzegovina) Bosnia & Herzegovina
- British Antarctic Territory
- British Indian Ocean Territory
- British Virgin Islands
- Burundi
- Cook Islands
- Eritrea
- Ethiopia
- Falkland Islands
- Fiji
- (The Gambia) Gambia
- Gibraltar
- Guinea
- Hong Kong
- Isle of Man – Ended in 2017
- Kyrgyzstan
- Liberia
- Macau
- Malaysia
- Nigeria
- Niue
- Peru
- Philippines
- Pitcairn Islands
- Saint Helena
- Senegal
- Seychelles
- Sierra Leone
- Solomon Islands
- Somaliland
- South Georgia and the South Sandwich Islands
- Spain
- Tajikistan
- Tanzania
- Tokelau
- Tonga
- Tristan da Cunha
- Uzbekistan
- Western Samoa
