= Australian Silver Koala =

Silver Koala
- Australia
- Value: 1 Dollar (face value)
- Mass: 31.1 g (1.0 troy oz)
- Diameter: 40.6 mm (1.52 in)
- Thickness: 4.0 mm (0.157 in)
- Edge: Reeded
- Composition: 99.99% Ag
- Years of minting: 2007-present

Obverse
- Design: Queen Elizabeth II
- Designer: Jody Clark
- Design date: 2015

Reverse
- Design: Koala hanging onto a tree branch
- Design date: 2019

The Silver Koala Bear is a silver coin originating from Australia and produced at the Perth Mint. While the obverse of the coin always depicts Queen Elizabeth II of Australia, the reverse side changes every year, always featuring a koala, a marsupial native to Australia.

The mint updates the monarch's portrait on obverse of the coin periodically. For example, Queen Elizabeth II has six portraits made in the course of her reign. However, only the fourth and sixth portraits were used on silver koalas.

Silver koalas have higher collectible value than some other bullion coins due to the yearly design change and limited production. The coins are minted yearly in up to five different sizes.

== Specifications ==
Specifications
Weight (troy oz)	Weight (grams)	Face Value	Diameter (mm)	Thickness† (mm)
	1,002.5	AU$30	100.6	14.6
10	312.35	AU$10	75.6	8.7
1	31.14	AU$1	40.6	4
1/2	15.6	50 cents	36.6	2.3
1/10	3.135	10 cents	20.6	2

† This is the maximum thickness. Thicknesses are different based upon the yearly design of the reverse side.

== History ==
In its first year of 2007, only the one-ounce bullion coin was minted. All other sizes were minted in 2008, except for the 1/10 oz, which started to be produced in 2011. Between 2008 and 2010, the only numismatic or proof coinage minted was the one-ounce with gilded koalas. As of 2020, bullion coins are currently released in 1 kg and 1 oz sizes and the numismatic coinage is minted in 5 oz and 1 oz sizes, with other sizes released occasionally. The coins were .999 fine silver until the 2018 edition, which increased in purity to .9999 silver. Perth Mint originally had no caps on the amount of one-ounce coins produced, but since 2018, it has been capped to 300,000.

Special editions such as privy marked, colored and gilded are often available.

Mintages for one-ounce bullion coins
Year	Standard	Privy marks	
2007	137,768	-	-
2008	84,057	Fabulous 12	5,000
2009	336,757	-	-
2010	233,531	-	-
2011	910,480	Berlin bear	48,920
2012	388,046	Berlin bear	32,361
2013	477,209	Chinese lettering	10,392
2014	334,884	Chinese lettering	8,397
2015	450,899	-	-
2016	300,000	-	-
2017	300,000	Kangaroo	40,636
2017	300,000	Rooster	24,940
2018	166,434	Dog	9,200
2019		Pig	

Mintages for proof coins
Year	1 oz	5 oz	1 kg
2007	-	-	-
2008	8,361 (Gilded)	-	-
2009	5,085 (Gilded)	-	-
2010	4,842 (Gilded)	-	-
2011	4,818 (Gilded)	5,000	-
2012	4,466 (Gilded)	4,178	471
2012	9,302 (High relief)	4,178	471
2013	4,844 (Gilded)	5,000	333
2013	8,796 (High relief)	5,000	333
2014	3,040 (Gilded)	367	500
2014	1,211 (High relief)	367	500
2014	2,092 (Colored)	367	500
2015	2,186 (Gilded)	1,033	417
2015	3,791 (High relief)	1,033	417
2016	2,241 (High relief)	952	143
2017	1,730 (High relief)	398	157
2018	135 (High relief)	231	-

== See also ==
- Australian Silver Kangaroo (bullion)
- Australian Silver Kookaburra
- Bullion
- Bullion coin
- Inflation hedge
- Platinum Koala
- Silver as an investment
