= List of acts of the Parliament of Western Australia from 1895 =

This is a list of acts of the Parliament of Western Australia for the year 1895.

== 1895 ==
=== Public acts ===
Short title, or popular name	Citation	Royal assent
Long title
Export Duties Repeal Act 1895	59 Vict. No. 1	17 July 1895
An Act to repeal certain Export Duties.
Standard Time Act 1895	59 Vict. No. 2	17 July 1895
An Act to establish a Standard of Time in Western Australia.
	59 Vict. No. 3	17 July 1895
An Act to confirm certain Expenditure for the year ending 30th June, One thousand eight hundred and ninety-four.
Uniforms Act 1895	59 Vict. No. 4	
Post Office Savings Bank Interest Act 1895	59 Vict. No. 5	
	59 Vict. No. 6	24 July 1895
An Act to apply out of the Consolidated Revenue Fund the sum of Two Hundred Thousand Pounds (Note: £200,000 in 1895 is equivalent to A$36,300,000 in 2022.) to the Service of the Year ending 30th June, 1896.
Agent General Act 1895	59 Vict. No. 7	28 Aug 1895
An Act to regulate the Appointment, and the Tenure of the Office, of Agent General.
Customs Duties Repeal Act 1895	59 Vict. No. 8	
Loan Act 1891 Re-appropriation Act 1895	59 Vict. No. 9	
Municipal Institutions Act 1895	59 Vict. No. 10	
Justices Appointment Act 1895	59 Vict. No. 11	
Perth Mint Act 1895	59 Vict. No. 12	28 August 1895
An Act for the Establishment and Maintenance in Western Australia of the Perth Branch of the Royal Mint.
Arbitration Act 1895	59 Vict. No. 13	
Licensed Surveyors Act 1895	59 Vict. No. 14	
Railway and Theatre Refreshment Rooms Licensing Act 1895	59 Vict. No. 15	
Fertilisers and Feeding Stuffs Act 1895	59 Vict. No. 16	
Medical Act Amendment Act 1895	59 Vict. No. 17	
Duties on Deceased Persons Estates Act 1895	59 Vict. No. 18	
Coolgardie-Kalgoorlie Railway Act 1895	59 Vict. No. 19	2 October 1895
An Act to authorise the Construction of a Railway from Coolgardie to Kalgoorlie.
Associations Incorporation Act 1895	59 Vict. No. 20	
Loan Act 1894 Amendment Act 1895	59 Vict. No. 21	
Married Women's Property Act 1895	59 Vict. No. 22	
Partnership Act 1895	59 Vict. No. 23	
Copyright Act 1895	59 Vict. No. 24	2 October 1895
An Act to regulate the Law of Copyright, and for other purposes.
Ecclesiastical Grant Abolition Act 1895	59 Vict. No. 25	
	59 Vict. No. 26	12 October 1895
An Act to apply a sum out of the Consolidated Revenue Fund and from Moneys to Credit of Loan Accounts to the Services of the Year ending the last day of June, One thousand eight hundred and ninety-six, and to appropriate the Supplies granted in this Session of Parliament.
Assisted Schools Abolition Act 1895	59 Vict. No. 27	
Trustee Ordinance 1854 Amendment Act 1895	59 Vict. No. 28	
Building Act 1884 Amendment Act 1895	59 Vict. No. 29	
Parks and Reserves Act 1895	59 Vict. No. 30	
Electoral Act 1895	59 Vict. No. 31	
Donnybrook-Bridgetown Railway Act 1895	59 Vict. No. 32	12 October 1895
An Act to authorise the Construction of a Railway from Donnybrook to Bridgetown.
Collie Coalfields Railway Act 1895	59 Vict. No. 33	12 October 1895
An Act to authorise the Construction of a Railway from the South-Western Railway to the Collie Coalfields.
Stock Diseases Act 1895	59 Vict. No. 34	
Public Health Act Further Amendment Act 1895	59 Vict. No. 35	
Engine Sparks Fire Prevention Act 1895	59 Vict. No. 36	
Mines Regulation Act 1895	59 Vict. No. 37	
Explosives Act 1895	59 Vict. No. 38	
Width of Tires Act 1895	59 Vict. No. 39	
Goldfields Act 1895	59 Vict. No. 40	
Sale of Goods Act 1895	59 Vict. No. 41	12 October 1895
An Act for codifying the Law relating to the Sale of Goods.

=== Private acts ===
Short title, or popular name	Citation	Royal assent
Long title
Roman Catholic Church Lands Act 1895	59 Vict. Private Act	12 October 1895
An Act to empower the Bishop of the Roman Catholic Church in Western Australia, and his successors in office, to lease, and raise money by way of mortgage on, Church lands and to sell certain of such lands in certain cases.
Western Australian Wesleyan Methodists Act 1895	59 Vict. Private Act	12 October 1895
An Act to adapt and assimilate the existing Trusts of Wesleyan Methodist Church Properties to the present Constitution of such Church in Western Australia, and for other collateral purposes.

== Sources ==
- "legislation.wa.gov.au".
