= Angel (Manx coin) =

Bullion coins of the Isle of Man

Gold Angel
- Isle of Man
- Value: 1 Angel
- Mass: 31.1 g (1.0 troy oz)
- Diameter: 32.7 mm (1.28 in)
- Thickness: 2.8 mm (0.11 in)
- Edge: Reeded
- Composition: 99.99% Au
- Years of minting: 1984-present

Obverse
- Design: Queen Elizabeth II
- Designer: Ian Rank-Broadley
- Design date: 1996

Reverse
- Design: Facing left, Archangel Michael is slaying a dragon
- Design: The upright Archangel Michael, facing right version

Manx Angels are gold or silver bullion coins distributed by the Isle of Man and minted by private companies. The Isle of Man is not part of the United Kingdom. It is a Crown dependency and thus can mint its own coins. The coin depicts Archangel Michael slaying a dragon. The silver coins have not been minted every year, but have an erratic schedule. Angels are legal tender but they do not have a fixed face value; instead, like the Krugerrand or Mexico's Libertad, they are legal tender to the value of their precious metal content.

== Specifications ==
The gold coins contain various amount of fineness. Depending on the year and the coin's size, it could contain 91.7% gold (.917 fine), 99.9% gold (.999 fine) or 99.99% gold (.9999 fine). The silver coins either contain 99.9% silver (.999 fine) or 99.99% silver (.9999 fine). The following table lists the coin's gold weight in troy ounces and the total weight of the coin in grams.

Specifications
Composition	Weight (troy oz)	.917 fine		.999 fine		
Composition	Weight (troy oz)	Weight (grams)	Diameter (mm)	Weight (grams)	Diameter (mm)	Thickness (mm)
Gold	20	678.67	75.2	-	-	-
Gold	15	508.96	65.4	-	-	-
Gold	10	339.34	56	-	-	-
Gold	5	169.67	50	155.5	50	
Gold	1	33.93	33	31.1	32.7	2.8
Gold	1/2	16.94	27	15.55	27	2.2
Gold	1/4	8.48	22	7.78	22	1.8
Gold	1/10	3.39	16.5	3.11	16.5	1.25
Gold	1/20	1.7	15	1.56	14.5	0.8
Gold	1/64	-	-	0.5	11	0.8
Silver	1	-	-	31.1	38.6	3.0

== Design ==
Obverse: Shows a portrait of Queen Elizabeth II with the text Isle of Man and Elizabeth II in capitals. There have been four different portraits of Queen Elizabeth used on the coins. The 1984 coin showed the second coin portrait, done when the Queen was in her early 40s. The third coin portrait, of the Queen in her 50s, was used between 1985 and 1997. The fourth portrait, of the 70-year old Queen, was used between 1998 and 2014. Since 2015, the fifth coin portrait has been used.

Reverse: Shows Archangel Michael fighting the dragon. In small lettering beneath the dragon, metal content, coin size and fineness are given. The design is framed by an elaborate Viking knit motif border with the island's coat of arms, the triskele, appearing at the top, above the ship's flag. The motif of Michael or a Saint slaying a dragon is found in other coins. Michael is used in Ukraine's Archangel Michael gold and silver bullion coins. Russia's Saint George the Victorious bullion coins show Saint George slaying a dragon. The United Kingdom's Sovereign gold bullion also show Saint George fighting a dragon. There have been three primary designs for the Angel. From 1984 to 1993, the Angel faced left. From 1994 to 2007, the Angel faced right. In 2008 and from 2010 to 2015, the Angel still faced right, but in a more upright position. The Angel changed back to the left facing pose starting in 2016. Some left facing coins were produced in 2014. The 2009 version of the coin had three different designs that haven't been produced before or since.

== History and mintages ==
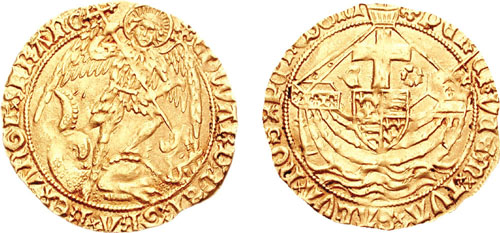
1470's gold coin was the first English coin depicting Angel Michael

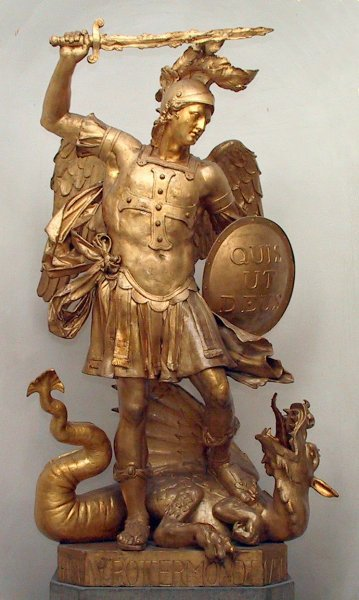
Statue of Archangel Michael at the University of Bonn, slaying Satan as a dragon

The Isle of Man has used three private mints to make their Angel coins, the English Pobjoy Mint from 1984 until 2016, Liechtenstein's Coin Investment Trust (CIT) and the English Tower Mint for coins after 2016 .

Several bimetallic coins have been minted. A 1995 quarter-ounce gold centered, platinum ring coin. A 2007 one-ounce gold coin with a silver ring. A 2011 one-ounce with the ring made of gold and the center platinum.

A two-ounce silver coin was produced in 2017 and 2018 with 999 minted each year. The 2015 silver coin had gilding applied to the Angel side of the coin and the 2017 silver coin had gilded highlights. Each year, the 1/20-ounce gold coins had a different privy mark above the dragon's head. Each year's privy mark related to a different day from the song 12 Days of Christmas.

The following table shows mintages of proof coins unless noted with a (b).
NR - Mintage numbers not released
(b) - Brilliant uncirculated finish. Not a proof coin

Mintages for gold and silver coins
Year	Gold									Silver
Year	1/64 oz	1/20 oz	1/10 oz	1/4 oz	1/2 oz	1 oz	5 oz	10 oz	15 oz	1 oz
1984	-	-	-	-	-	NR (b)	-	-	-	-
1984	-	-	-	-	-	3,000	-	-	-	-
1985	-	-	17,000 (b)	2,117 (b)	1,776 (b)	28,000 (b)	104 (b)	79 (b)	-	-
1985	-	-	3,000	51	51	3,000	90	68	-	-
1986	-	-	NR (b)	1,000	NR (b)	NR (b)	89 (b)	47 (b)	-	-
1986	-	-	NR	NR	3,000	NR	250	250	-	-
1987	-	-	NR (b)	NR (b)	NR (b)	NR (b)	150 (b)	30 (b)	150 (b)	-
1987	-	-	NR	2,500+	NR	NR	27	150	18	-
1988	-	-	NR (b)	NR (b)	NR (b)	NR (b)	250 (b)	250	-	-
1988	-	-	1,000	3,000	NR (b)	1,000	250 (b)	250	-	-
1989	-	-	250	NR (b)	-	-	-	-	-	-
1989	-	-	250	3,500	-	-	-	-	-	-
1990	-	-	1,000	2,000 (b)	-	-	-	-	-	-
1990	-	-	1,000	2,450	-	-	-	-	-	-
1991	-	-	400	710	-	-	-	-	-	-
1992	-	-	100	-	-	-	-	-	-	-
1993	-	-	-	NR	-	-	-	-	-	-
1994	-	-	NR	NR	NR (b)	NR (b)	-	-	-	NR
1994	-	-	NR	NR	NR	NR	-	-	-	NR
1995	-	-	NR (b)	NR (b)	NR (b)	NR (b)	-	-	-	-
1995	-	-	NR	NR	NR	NR	-	-	-	-
1996	-	-	NR (b)	NR (b)	NR (b)	NR (b)	-	-	-	-
1996	-	-	NR	NR	NR	NR	-	-	-	-
1997	-	-	NR (b)	NR (b)	NR (b)	NR (b)	-	-	-	-
1997	-	-	NR	NR	NR	NR	-	-	-	-
1998	-	-	NR (b)	NR (b)	NR (b)	NR (b)	-	-	-	-
1998	-	-	NR	NR	NR	NR	-	-	-	-
1999	-	-	NR (b)	NR (b)	NR (b)	NR (b)	-	-	-	-
1999	-	-	NR	NR	NR	NR	-	-	-	-
2000	-	-	NR (b)	NR (b)	-	NR (b)	-	-	-	-
2000	-	-	NR	NR	-	NR	-	-	-	-
2001	-	NR (b)	NR (b)	NR (b)	-	NR (b)	-	-	-	-
2001	-	NR	NR	NR	-	NR	-	-	-	-
2002	-	NR (b)	NR (b)	NR (b)	-	NR (b)	-	-	-	-
2002	-	NR	NR	NR	-	NR	-	-	-	-
2003	-	-	NR (b)	NR (b)	-	NR (b)	-	-	-	-
2003	-	NR	NR	NR	-	NR	-	-	-	-
2004	-	NR (b)	NR (b)	NR (b)	-	NR (b)	-	-	-	-
2004	-	NR	NR	NR	-	NR	-	-	-	-
2005	-	NR (b)	NR (b)	NR (b)	-	NR (b)	-	-	-	-
2005	-	NR	NR	NR	-	500	-	-	-	-
2006	-	NR (b)	-	-	-	NR (b)	-	-	-	-
2006	-	NR	-	-	-	NR	-	-	-	-
2007	-	NR (b)	-	-	-	NR (b)	-	-	-	-
2007	-	NR	-	-	-	NR	-	-	-	-
2008	-	1,000	-	-	500 (b)	NR (b)	-	-	-	-
2008	-	1,000	-	-	500 (b)	NR	-	-	-	-
2009	-	1,000	NR (b)	20,000	-	NR	-	-	-	-
2010	-	1,000	-	-	-	NR (b)	-	-	-	50,000
2010	-	1,000	-	-	-	NR	-	-	-	50,000
2011	-	1,000	-	-	-	NR (b)	-	-	-	-
2011	-	1,000	-	-	-	NR	-	-	-	-
2012	-	1,000	NR (b)	-	999 (b)	NR	-	-	-	-
2013	-	1,000	-	-	-	-	-	-	-	-
2014	-	1,000	2,016	-	999	NR (b)	-	-	-	NR (b)
2015	-	1,000	-	-	999	NR (b)	-	-	-	NR (b)
2015	-	1,000	-	-	999	NR (b)	-	-	-	6,000
2016	-	-	NR	-	-	NR (b)	-	-	-	100,000
2016	-	-	NR	-	-	NR (b)	-	-	-	5,000
2017	15,000	-	2,499	999	-	100 (b)	-	-	-	NR (b)
2017	15,000	-	2,499	999	-	100 (b)	-	-	-	5,500
2018	15,000	-	-	-	-	100 (b)	-	-	-	15,000
2019	-	-	2,499	999	NR	NR	-	-	-	9,999

== See also ==
- Angel (coin) - the historic English gold coin
- Ukrainian Archangel Michael - similar gold and silver bullion coins minted for the National Bank of Ukraine, also featuring Michael
- Manx Noble - platinum, gold and silver coins
- Bullion
- Bullion coin
- Inflation hedge
