= Australian Silver Kookaburra =

Australian silver bullion coin

Silver Kookaburra
- Australia
- Value: 1 Dollar (face value)
- Mass: 31.1 g (1.0 troy oz)
- Diameter: 40.6 mm (1.52 in)
- Thickness: 2.98 mm (0.117 in)
- Edge: Reeded slanted left
- Composition: 99.99% Ag
- Years of minting: 1990-present

Obverse
- Design: Queen Elizabeth II
- Designer: Jody Clark
- Design date: 2015

Reverse
- Design: A kookaburra at sunset
- Designer: Aleysha Howart
- Design date: 2018

The Silver Kookaburra is a silver bullion coin originating from Australia, and produced at the Perth Mint starting in 1990. The coins were .999 fine silver until the 2018 edition, which increased in purity to .9999 silver. While the obverse of the coin always depicts the reigning monarch--Queen Elizabeth II during her reign and now features King Charles III, the reverse side changes every year, always featuring a kookaburra, a bird native to Australia. Due to the yearly design change and limited production of the one-ounce coins, they have higher collectible value than some other bullion coins. The Perth Mint, generally, ships the coins in individual plastic capsules. One-ounce coins ship in shrink wrap rolls of 20, with 5 rolls in each box of 100. They are minted in four sizes; 1,000 g, 10, 2 and 1 troy ounces.

To commemorate the 25th anniversary of the kookaburra coin, the 2015 coin features the same image of the kookaburra as the original 1990 coin. To differentiate the 1990 and 2015 coins, the date on the reverse reads "1990-2015" and 2015 has been added to the obverse. The 2015 coin had a release date of September 1, 2014.

== Specifications ==
Specifications
Weight (troy oz)	Weight (grams)	Face Value	Diameter (mm)	Thickness (mm)
	1,002.5	AU$30	101	14.6
10	312.35	AU$10	75.5	8.7
2	62.77	AU$2	50.3	4.5
1	31.135	AU$1	40.6	4

== One Ounce History ==
The maximum mintage of the one troy ounce coin is capped, while the others have unlimited mintage, based on demand. Perth Mint originally intended to expand the 2013 mintage to one million coins, however, they later reduced this number to 500,000 and declared that future years would continue to be limited to this amount. In addition to the annual design change, there is also a design change between the bullion and proof versions of the coin each year. No proof coins were minted between 2006 and 2011; however, there was a 1-ounce silver proof Kookaburra colored coin struck in 2012 for the Discover Australia coin series. Since 2012, the proof coin has been struck in high relief only.

Special editions such as privy marked, colored and gilded are often available.

Mintages for standard bullion and proof coins
Year	Bullion mintage	Proof mintage
1990	300,000	21,671
1991	300,000	6,673
1992	219,694	6,766
1993	190,581	5,121
1994	174,561	2,500
1995	154,247	3,000
1996	170,105	3,500
1997	159,497	2,466
1998	103,119	2,114
1999	109,364	1,646
2000	104,169	2,583
2001	169,265	3,241
2002	91,604	1,733
2003	109,439	1,571
2004	84,455	1,446
2005	95,145	2,346
2006	87,044	-
2007	213,436	-
2008	300,000	-
2009	300,000	-
2010	300,000	-
2011	500,000	-
2012	500,000	10,000
2013	500,000	5,378
2014	500,000	2,550
2015	500,000	8,000
2016	500,000	2,401
2017	406,265	2,845
2018	243,740	1,935
2019	219,660	
2020	375,914	
2021	266,676	

Mintages for privy marked and special releases
Year	Privy Mark	Particularity	Mintage
1992	Eagle	Proof coins only	750
1993	Sydney Opera House	Proof coins only	15,000
1994	Team Australia — Commonwealth Games		15,000
1995	Giant panda	Gilded privy	10,000
1996	Giant panda	Gilded privy	15,000
1996	Tricentennial naming of the Swan River		5,000
1996	Eiffel Tower (France)		5,000
1996	Brandenburg Gate (Germany)		5,000
1996	Tower Bridge (Great Britain)		5,000
1996	Colossus of Rhodes (Greece)		5,000
1996	The Hague (Netherlands)		5,000
1996	Goya's La Maja desnuda	Gilded privy	2,500
1996	Basler stab		2,500
1996	Date on edge of coin	Date and serial number	1,500
1997	Dragon	Gilded privy	20,000
1997	Phoenix	Gilded privy	20,000
1997	Panda	Gilded privy	15,000
1997	Little Mermaid (Denmark)		5,000
1997	Elk (Finland)		5,000
1997	Roman Colosseum (Italy)		5,000
1997	Windmill (Netherlands)		5,000
1997	Monument of the Discoveries (Portugal)		5,000
1997	Utrecht Coat of Arms		2,500
1997	Zurich Coat of Arms		2,500
1997	Japanese Golden Yen	Gilded privy	2,500
1997	Thomas Edison	Gilded privy	2,500
1998	St. Stephen's Cathedral (Austria)		5,000
1998	Celtic harp (Ireland)		5,000
1998	Robert Schuman Building (Luxembourg)		5,000
1998	Alhambra palace (Spain)		5,000
1998	Vasa warship (Sweden)		5,000
1999	1999 Australian Gold Sovereign coin	Gilded privy	5,000
1999	Austrian 20 Schillings		5,000
1999	Belgian 50 Francs		5,000
1999	Finnish 1 Markka		5,000
1999	French 5 Francs		5,000
1999	German 1 Mark		5,000
1999	Irish 1 Punt		5,000
1999	Italian 1,000 Lire		5,000
1999	Luxembourg 50 Francs		5,000
1999	Dutch 1 Gulden		5,000
1999	Portuguese 50 Escudos		5,000
1999	Spanish 100 Pesetas		5,000
1999	Australian 1919 square penny		3,500
1999	16th century Japanese Koban coin	Gilded privy	2,500
2001	Commonwealth Star	Gilded privy	10,000
2001	Santa Claus	Colored privy	1,000
2002	US Flag	Colored privy	18,496
2004	Gilded kookaburras		10,000
2005	Western zodiac (12 coins total)		5,000 (for each month)
2007	Gilded kookaburra		10,000
2012	Lunar dragon		64,989
2013	Lunar snake		50,000
2013	Fabulous 15		7,600
2014	Lunar horse		50,000
2014	Fabulous 15		7,000
2015	Lunar goat		50,000
2015	Fabulous 15		7,350
2016	Lunar monkey		50,000
2016	Fabulous 15		5,252
2017	Lunar rooster		50,000
2017	Panda		8,000
2017	Shark		31,482
2018	Lunar dog		50,000
2018	Panda		8,000
2018	Fabulous 15		4,805

== See also ==
- Australian Silver Kangaroo (bullion)
- Australian Silver Koala
- Bullion
- Bullion coin
- Inflation hedge
- Silver as an investment
