= Canadian Maple Leaf coins =

Series of Canadian bullion coins

The Canadian Maple Leaf coins are bullion coins of gold, silver, platinum, or palladium, issued by the Royal Canadian Mint:

- Canadian Gold Maple Leaf
- Canadian Silver Maple Leaf
- Canadian Platinum Maple Leaf
- Canadian Palladium Maple Leaf
