= Centenario (coin) =

Series of Mexican gold coins

The Centenario is a Mexican gold bullion coin first minted in 1921 to commemorate the 100th anniversary of Mexico's independence from Spain. The coin is not intended to be used as currency; the face value of 50 pesos is for legal purposes only, and does not reflect the actual value of the gold content.

The obverse of the Centenario contains the image of Winged Victory (El Ángel, El Ángel de la Independencia: "The Angel of Independence"), with a laurel wreath in her right hand and broken chains in her left. Two famous Mexican volcanoes, Popocatepetl and Iztaccíhuatl, rise in the background. The 1821 on the lower left commemorates the year of Mexico's independence. The date on the right indicates year of mintage, with the 1921 and 1931 (the last year of the original series) mintages being particularly valuable. Production restarted in 1943 due to the demand for gold coins, and coins minted between 1949 and 1972 are usually marked "1947".

This coin was designed by Emilio del Moral.

The reverse depicts the coat of arms of Mexico, which shows the Golden eagle perched on a cactus with a serpent (rattlesnake) in its beak.

The Centenario weighs 41.67 grams and contains 37.5 grams (1.20565 troy ounces) of gold in an alloy of 90% gold and 10% copper (crown gold), and is 37 mm in diameter. The 1943 mintage is somewhat special because of the double "37.5 Gr Oro Puro" markings, leaving out the "50 pesos" legend, and has the same diameter : 37 mm.

The original Centenario design was used in the later Libertad Series of gold and silver bullion coins.

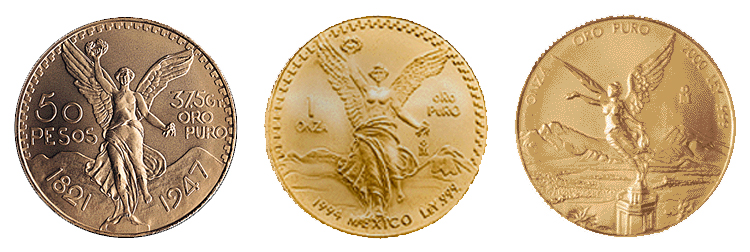
1947 Centenario (left), 1994 Gold Libertad (center) and a 2000 Gold Libertad

== Minting history ==
Year	Quantity minted
1921	180,000
1922	463,000
1923	432,000
1924	439,000
1925	716,000
1926	600,000
1927	606,000
1928	538,000
1929	458,000
1930	372,000
1931	137,000
1943	89,000
1944	593,000
1945	1,012,000
1946	1,588,000
1947	309,000
1949-1972*	3,975,654
1996*	7,954,777
2000-2009*	302,000

- *With date of 1947
