= Kijang Emas =

Official gold bullion coin of Malaysia

The Malaysian Kijang Emas is the official gold bullion coin of Malaysia and is minted by the Royal Mint of Malaysia. It was first issued on 17 July 2001. Malaysia is the 12th country in the world to issue its own gold bullion coin.

The Kijang Emas has a gold purity of 999.9 millesimal fineness or 24 karat. The coins come in denominations of RM200, RM100 and RM50 which are nominal face values, and weighs 1 oz, ½ oz and ¼ oz respectively. RM is the notation for the Malaysian ringgit.

The purchase and resale price of Kijang Emas is determined by the prevailing international gold market price.

== History ==
The Malaysian Kijang Emas was first minted in December 2000 by the Royal Mint of Malaysia. It was launched by the then Prime Minister of Malaysia, Tun Dr. Mahathir Mohamad on 17 July 2001.

Malaysia is the 12th country in the world to issue its own gold bullion coin, and joins the ranks of the Canadian Gold Maple Leaf, American Gold Eagle, Australian Gold Nugget, and South African Krugerrand.

== Denominations ==
Denomination	Weight	Gold Purity	Diameter
RM200	1 oz	9999	37.00 mm
RM100	½ oz	9999	28.00 mm
RM50	¼ oz	9999	22.00 mm

== Design ==
The obverse side of the Kijang Emas showcases a barking deer, or "kijang," set in the backdrop of the Malaysian wilderness. It also features the inscription "BANK NEGARA MALAYSIA", indicating that the central bank of Malaysia issued the coins. In addition, the text "KIJANG EMAS", the coin's weight, its gold purity, and the year it was minted are displayed.

Meanwhile, the reverse side is adorned with the hibiscus, Malaysia's national flower, and the words BANK NEGARA MALAYSIA in Jawi (Arabic) script.

== Pricing ==
The purchase and resale price of Kijang Emas is determined by the prevailing international gold market price. For example, on 18 January 2008, the coins are offered for sale at RM3,052, RM1,555 and RM792 for 1 oz, ½ oz and ¼ oz respectively, when the price of gold in the market was US$879 (RM2,916) per troy ounce.

The Kijang Emas is retailed by Maybank in Malaysia.
