= Australian Gold Nugget =

Australian gold bullion coin

Gold Nugget
- Australia
- Value: Australian Dollar
- Edge: Milled
- Composition: .9999 gold
- Years of minting: 1986–present

Obverse
- Design: Head of state of Australia
- Designer: Ian Rank-Broadley

Reverse
- Design: Kangaroo (varies by year)

The Australian Gold Nugget, also sometimes known as the Australian Gold Kangaroo, is a gold bullion coin minted by the Perth Mint. The coins have been minted in denominations of 1/20 oz, 1/10 oz, 1/4 oz, 1/2 oz, 1 oz, 2 oz, 10 oz, and 1 kg of 24 carat gold.

They have legal tender status in Australia—though worth far more as bullion than their face value—and are one of few legal tender bullion gold coins to change their design every year, another being the Chinese Gold Panda. This may raise their numismatic value over the value of gold used, unlike many other bullion coins.

== History ==
The Gold Nugget series was introduced in 1986 by Gold Corporation, a company wholly owned by the Government of Western Australia, more commonly known by its trading name The Perth Mint. This issue of coins had two unique features: a "two-tone" frosted design effect, and individual hard plastic encapsulation of each coin. These features were unusual for a standard bullion coin and gave the Nugget a unique market niche.

From 1986 to 1989, the reverse of these coins pictured various Australian gold nuggets. For example, the Welcome Stranger nugget was depicted on the 1987 1 oz Australian Nugget coin while the 1/2 oz Australian Nugget coin of the same year showed the Hand of Faith nugget.

With the 1989 proof edition, the design was changed to feature different kangaroos, a more world-recognised symbol of Australia. The coins are today sometimes referred to as "gold kangaroos".

In 1991, 2 oz, 10 oz, and 1 kilogram sizes were introduced. These were created with the intention of using economies of scale to keep premiums low, and are some of the largest gold coins ever minted. In 1992, the face values on these large coins were lowered to keep them proportional to the 1 oz coin. The reverse of these coins does not change annually like the lower denominations; the same "red kangaroo" design is used every year.

In October 2011, the Perth Mint created a one tonne gold coin, breaking the record for the biggest and most valuable gold coin, previously held by the Royal Canadian Mint, the Big Maple Leaf. The coin is approximately 80 cm (31 in) in diameter and 12 cm (4.7 in) thick. It features a red kangaroo on the front of the coin and a portrait of Queen Elizabeth II on the reverse. The face value of the coin is A$1 million, but at the time of minting it was valued at over A$53 million.

The Australian Gold Nugget coins should not be mistaken for the Australian Lunar Gold Bullion coins. Both coins are minted by Perth Mint and have .9999 purity, but Lunar coins use images of different animals from the Chinese calendar instead of the kangaroo.

== Specifications ==
Type	Diameter	Thickness	Weight	Face value
1/20 troy oz coin	14.10 mm	1.40 mm	1.6 g (0.05 ozt)	A$5
1/10 troy oz coin	16.10 mm	1.30 mm	3.1 g (0.1 ozt)	A$15
1/4 troy oz coin	20.10 mm	1.80 mm	7.8 g (0.25 ozt)	A$25
1/2 troy oz coin	25.10 mm	2.20 mm	16 g (0.5 ozt)	A$50
1 troy oz coin	32.10 mm	2.65 mm	31 g (1 ozt)	A$100
2 troy oz coin	40.40 mm	3.35 mm	62 g (2 ozt)	A$500 (1991); A$200 (1992–)
10 troy oz coin	59.70 mm	7.65 mm	310 g (10 ozt)	A$2,500 (1991); A$1,000 (1992–)
1 kilo coin	74.50 mm	15.80 mm	1 kg (32 ozt)	A$10,000 (1991); A$3,000 (1992–)
1 tonne coin	approx 800 mm	approx 120 mm	1,012 kg (32,500 ozt)	A$1,000,000

== See also ==
- Big Maple Leaf
- Spanish gold Lynx
