= American Eagle bullion coins =

American Eagle bullion coins are produced by the United States Mint.

These include:

- American Silver Eagle
- American Gold Eagle
- American Platinum Eagle
- American Palladium Eagle
