= Angel (coin) =

Medieval gold coin in England

Angel gold coin
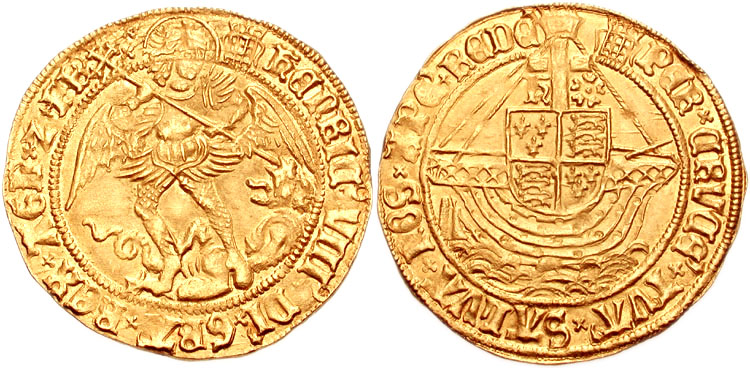
First side of the image: The image of the Archangel Saint Michael slaying a dragon, the legend inscribed with HENRIC VIII DI GRA REX AGL & FR
Second side of the image: The image of an English galley with the monogram 'H' and a rose set below the main topmast, the ship surmounted by a shield bearing the King's arms, the legend inscribed PER CRVCE TVA SALVA NOS XPC REDE.
AV 29mm, 5.12 g, 8h. Mm: portcullis, London. First coinage, 1509–1526.

The angel was an English gold coin introduced by Edward IV in 1465. It was patterned after the French angelot or ange, which had been issued since 1340. The name derived from its representation of the archangel Michael slaying a dragon. As it was considered a new issue of the noble, it was also called the angel-noble.

In 1472, the half-angel was introduced with a similar design weighing 40 grains (2.6 grammes) with a diameter of 20 to 21 millimetres.

== Design ==
Obverse: The Archangel Michael standing over a dragon (representing The Devil) and piercing it with a spear.

Reverse: Depicts a ship with the rays of the sun at the top of the cross-shaped masthead and an inescutcheon with the Royal Coat of Arms overall.
It was later replaced starting in the third coinage issue (1619–1624) of James I's reign with a galleon in a trian-aspect view (simulated three-dimensional rendering), a straight pillar-shaped masthead, and its sails decorated with the Stuart Royal Coat of Arms. It is also shown reversed, or depicted towards the dexter (i.e., facing the right-hand side of the heraldic field, or left-hand side of the coin).

Legend 1 (1344–1553): per cruce[m] tua[m] salva nos christe rede[mptor], Latin > "By Thy cross save us, Christ Redeemer."
Legend 2 (1553–1604): a domino factum est istud et est mirab[ile in oculis nostrum], Latin > "This was done by the Lord, and it is wondr[ous in our eyes]." From Psalm 118; motto adopted by Mary I Tudor.
Legend 3 (1604–1624): a domino factum est istud, Latin > "This was done by the Lord". Truncated motto adopted by James I Stuart of England (James VI of Scotland).
Legend 4 (1625–1642): amor populi praesidium regis, Latin > "The love of the people is the protection of the king." Ironic motto adopted by Charles I Stuart.
Legend 5 (1660–1807): soli deo gloria, Latin > "To God alone the glory." Used on non-circulating gold-plated touchpieces by the reigning House of Stuart from 1660 to 1714 and the Jacobite pretenders in exile from 1689 to 1807.

== Value ==
The angel varied in value from 6 shillings 8 pence to 11 shillings between Edward's reign and the time of James I.

- In 1526 during the reign of Henry VIII, it increased to seven shillings and six pence (7/6) or 90 pence.
- In 1544, it increased again to eight shillings (8/-) or 96 pence.
- In 1550 during the reign of Edward VI it increased to ten shillings (10/-) or 120 pence or £1/2.
- In 1612 during the reign of James I it increased to eleven shillings (11/-) or 132 pence.
- In 1619 it decreased to ten shillings (10/-) and at that point in time it weighed 70 grains (4.5 g).

It was last minted during the reign of Charles I in 1642 before the English Civil War (1642–1651). It was not minted during the Commonwealth under the rule of the Cromwells as it was seen as impious and idolatrous. In 1663, Charles II replaced the existing coinage with entirely new designs struck by machine ("milled"). The standard gold coin then became the guinea.

=== Touch pieces ===
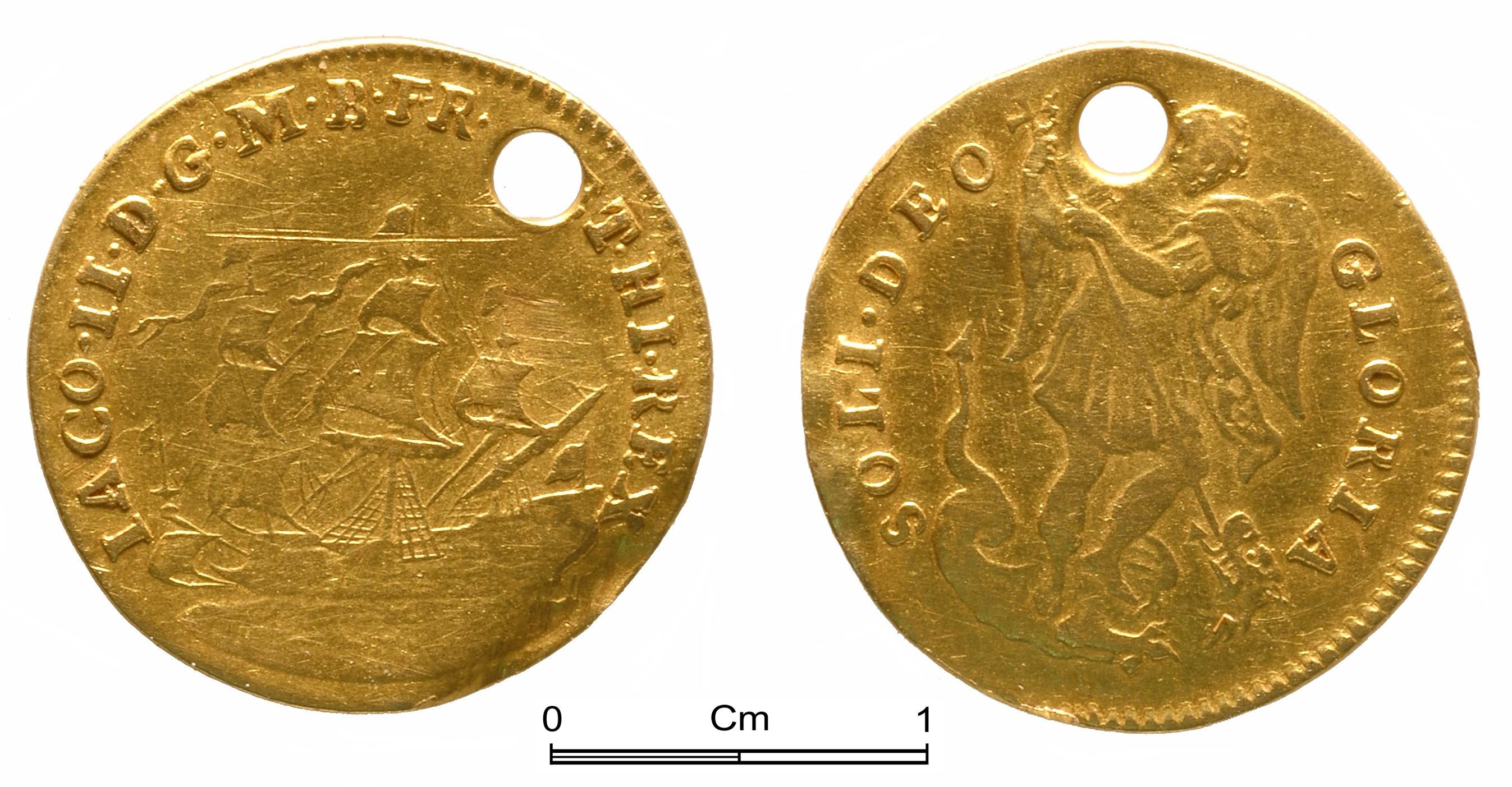
Touch piece of James II

In France and England there was a superstitious belief that the royal touch could cure scrofula, or "the king's evil". The kings of England often performed a ceremonial laying of hands on sufferers, and then gave each one a gold Angel coin.

After his execution in 1649, royalists believed that Angel coins that had been given to sufferers by the "martyred" King Charles I could miraculously cure scrofula. In 1660, Charles II began handing out gold-plated "touch-pieces" in the place of Angel coins. This was continued by his successors until the death of Queen Anne Stuart in 1714, though it was briefly halted from 1689 to 1702 by Queen Mary II Stuart and her co-regent William III of Orange.

It was also practised by the exiled James II Stuart and the other Jacobite pretenders after he was deposed in 1689. (The Jacobite touch pieces were plated in silver instead of gold as an economy measure.) They were last issued by the fourth and final direct Jacobite pretender, "Henry IX" Stuart (the Cardinal King) until his death in 1807.

== Social impact ==
The angel was such an iconic coin that many English pubs were named after it. The Angel Inn in Islington (after which the Angel tube station is named) was one of these.

The angel was traditionally given to people with the disease known as "king's evil", in a medieval ceremony intended to heal them with the "royal touch". After it was no longer minted, medals with the same device (called touch pieces) were given instead.

The 1610 General Assembly of the Church of Scotland in Glasgow was named after the coins. M'Crie wrote: "The bribery practised at this Assembly was shamefully notorious. Golden coins, called angels, were so plentifully distributed among the ministers, that it was called, by way of derision, the angelical Assembly."

== See also ==
- Angel (Manx coin)
- Agnel (coin)
- Maundy money
