= Noah's Ark silver coins =

Armenian bullion coins issued since 2011

Noah's Ark
- Armenia
- Value: 500 Dram (face value)
- Mass: 31.103 g (1.00 troy oz)
- Diameter: 38.6 mm (1.52 in)
- Thickness: 2.8 mm (0.110 in)
- Edge: Serrated
- Composition: 99.9% Ag
- Years of minting: 2011–present

Obverse
- Design: Coat of arms of Armenia

Reverse
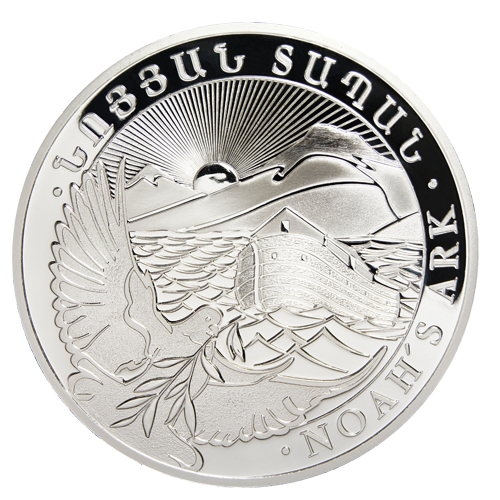
- Design: Noah's Ark, Mount Ararat, Sun and Dove
- Designer: Eduard Kurghinyan

The Noah's Ark silver coins are Armenian bullion coins issued since 2011. They are available in various sizes with a fine weight between 1/4 ounce and 5 kg in silver of 999/1000 fineness. The 1 troy oz. coin has a nominal value of 500 Drams and is legal tender in Armenia. The coin is produced by the Leipziger Edelmetallverarbeitungs GmbH, an affiliated company of Geiger Edelmetalle. The motif of the coin remains constant, similar to other bullion coins, such as the Canadian Silver Maple Leaf, the Vienna Philharmonic and the American Silver Eagle.

== Background ==
The iconic bible story of Noah's Ark was selected as a motif for the bullion coin. The Genesis flood narrative tells how God punished mankind with a flood because of their sins, with the exception of Noah and his family. God tells Noah that he is sending a flood and gives him detailed instructions for building an ark (a large boat) and taking aboard two or more of every animal species. Endless rain completely covers the Earth, submerging all of the land, but Noah is saved, along with his family and the animals he gathered. The floodwaters eventually subside, and Noah's ark comes to rest on Mount Ararat.

A large area of Mount Ararat was in Armenian territory, as the border between Armenia and Turkey ran over the top of the mountain. Armenia was divided between the Soviet Union and Turkey following World War I, and Mount Ararat became part of Turkey. However, the mountain remains important, as it is best viewed from Armenia's capital, Yerevan, and hence is a part of the country's national identity. The symbolic figure of Mount Ararat is still present in the coat of arms of Armenia.

== Obverse ==
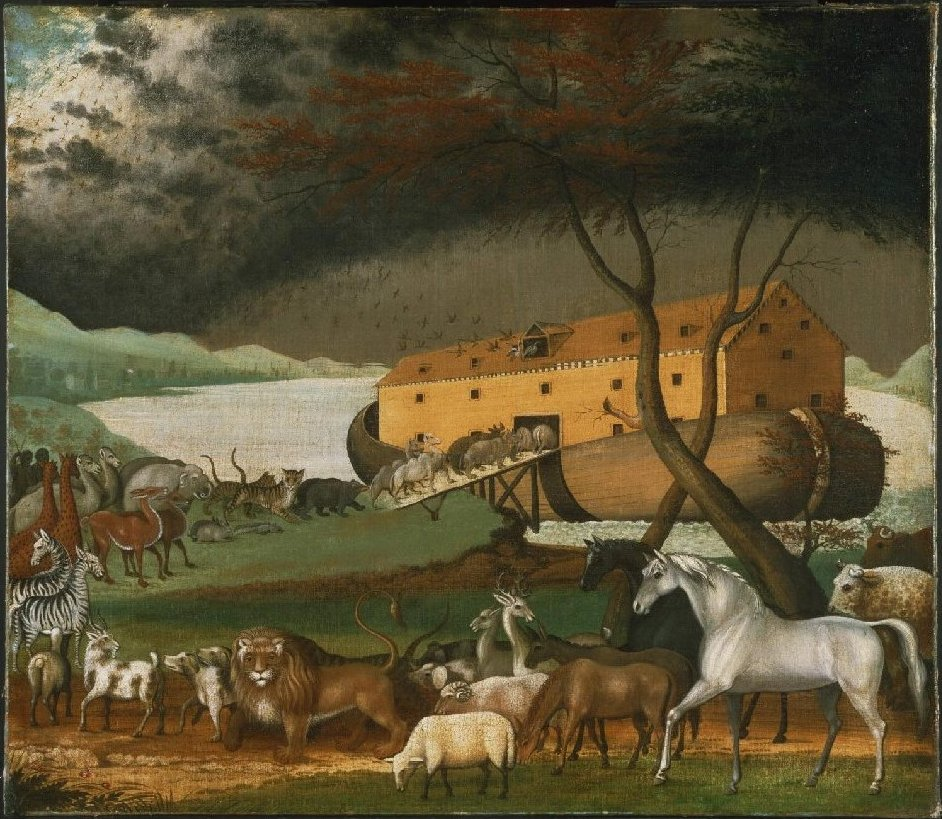
Noah's Ark (1846), by American folk painter Edward Hicks

The obverse of this exclusive coin edition depicts the Armenian Coat of Arms. Underneath is the face value of the coin in Armenian Dram, the fineness, the weight and the year of issue of the coin, next to the symbol of the mint. The lettering "Republic of Armenia” in Armenian and English language surrounds the ensemble.

== Reverse ==
The coin's reverse depicts Noah's Ark in the center of the motif. The white dove with an olive branch in the beak is flying towards the ark. Mount Ararat and the Sun are shown in the background. The inscription is also the name of the coin: “Noah´s Ark” in Armenian and English lettering is minted around the motif.

== Material ==
The Noah's Ark silver bullion coins are minted with a fineness of 999/1000. The diameter is 38.6 mm (1 troy ounce) and its edge is reeded. Since the first year of issue in 2011, Noah's Ark coins have been produced in the denominations and sizes of 1/4 (100 Dram), 1/2 (200 Dram) and 1 ounce (500 Dram). Introduced in 2012 were the larger denominations and sizes of 5 ounces (1,000 Dram), 10 ounces (5,000 Dram), One kilogram and five kilogram coins. Since its inauguration, more than 5 million Noah's Ark silver coins have been produced and distributed all over the world.

== Mintage ==
Year	1/4 oz	1/2 oz	1 oz	5 oz	10 oz	Kilo	5 Kilo
2011	17,068	15,533	268,325				
2012	173,696	102,028	457,576	3,550	2,003	2,449	163
2013	124,713	90,024	581,800	2,436	1,992	2,826	171
2014	113,723	87,563	566,323	4,535	3,645	2,590	476
2015	183,622	139,722	960,182	3,348	4,065	2,485	473
2016	292,562	156,002	529,202	4,123	4,562	3,606	449
2017	388,501	81,701	479,551	2,559	2,360	1,507	332
2018	298,501	73,601	234,001	1,401	1,061	963	195
2019	337,001	66,001	725,001	2,123	1,945	2,670	284
2020	666,501	111,041	861,001	3,801	3,881	1,520	350
2021	741,501	240,501	1,661,506	6,482	5,672	3,501	652
2022	868,503	330,003	2,829,003	7,203	6,563	3,703	385
2023	TBD	TBD	TBD	TBD	TBD	TBD	191
2024	TBD	TBD	TBD	TBD	TBD	TBD	TBD

== Silver Proof Sets ==
The proof edition is limited to 2,000 pieces. The Armenian Central Bank distributes 1,000 and the other 1,000 of them are sold in the European market by dealers. The coins in the European market are sold as a set in the sizes of 1 oz, 1/2 oz and 1/4 oz. The coins are numbered on the shiny spots of the edge.

== 2017 Gold Proof Coins ==
In 2017 the coin received its accolade – it was issued for the first time as a gold collector's coin in proof quality. These strictly limited gold coins were minted with a purity of 999.9 gold, and packed in attractive boxes. Each individual coin carries a fine number engraving on the obverse side and was delivered with a certificate of authenticity.

This exclusive edition was produced in one of Germany's most modern mints, using the finest gold granules of certified origin. The quality, fineness and fine weight are monitored and guaranteed by the Armenian Central Bank.

In addition to the individually packed coins, a special edition 4-coin set limited to 50 pieces was released.

Weight	Value	Gold Content	Fineness	Diameter	Mintage
1 gram	100 Dram	1 g	999.9	13.9	3,000
1/4 oz	10,000 Dram	7.78 g	999.9	20	1,000
1/2 oz	25,000 Dram	15.55 g	999.9	25.2	800
1 oz	50,000 Dram	31.1 g	999.9	30.2	500

== See also ==
- Bullion
- Bullion coin
- Inflation hedge
- Silver as an investment
