= Gold Corporation =

Company owned by the Government of Western Australia

Gold Corporation is an Australian company owned by the Government of Western Australia. It was established by the Gold Corporation Act 1987, with a mandate to operate the Perth Mint, market Australian gold, and other related activities.

== Sources ==
- Minister for Mines and Petroleum (18 December 1987). Gold Corporation Act 1987. Western Australia: Government of Western Australia. Gold Banking Corporation Act 1987.
- "Group Profile". Perth Mint. 7 June 2012. Archived from the original on 6 June 2012.
