= Spanish gold Lynx =

Spanish gold bullion coin, issued 2021

The Spanish gold lynx or Spanish doubloon (name for the entire lynx series and successors) is a gold bullion coin issued by the Kingdom of Spain, minted for the first time in 2021 for the Spanish Royal Mint. Its grade is pure gold 999.9 (24 carats) according to Provision 14038 of BOE no. 198 of 2021. The quality of its minting is Proof Reverse, for which the motifs have a mirror shine while the background is matte.

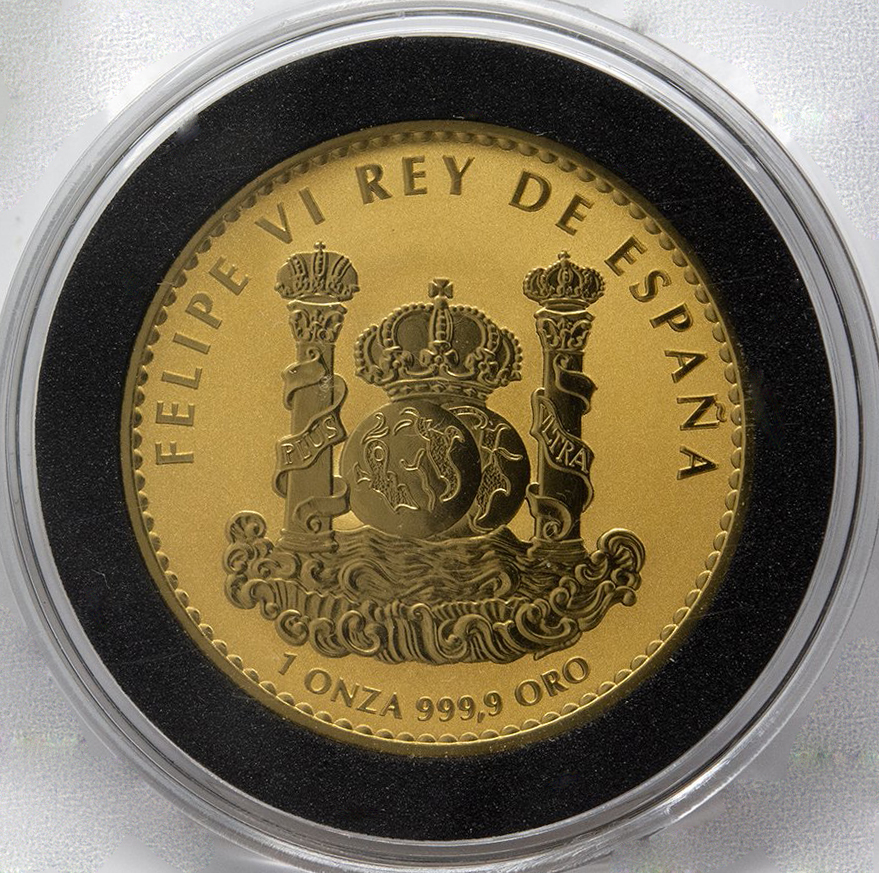
Front Spanish doubloon

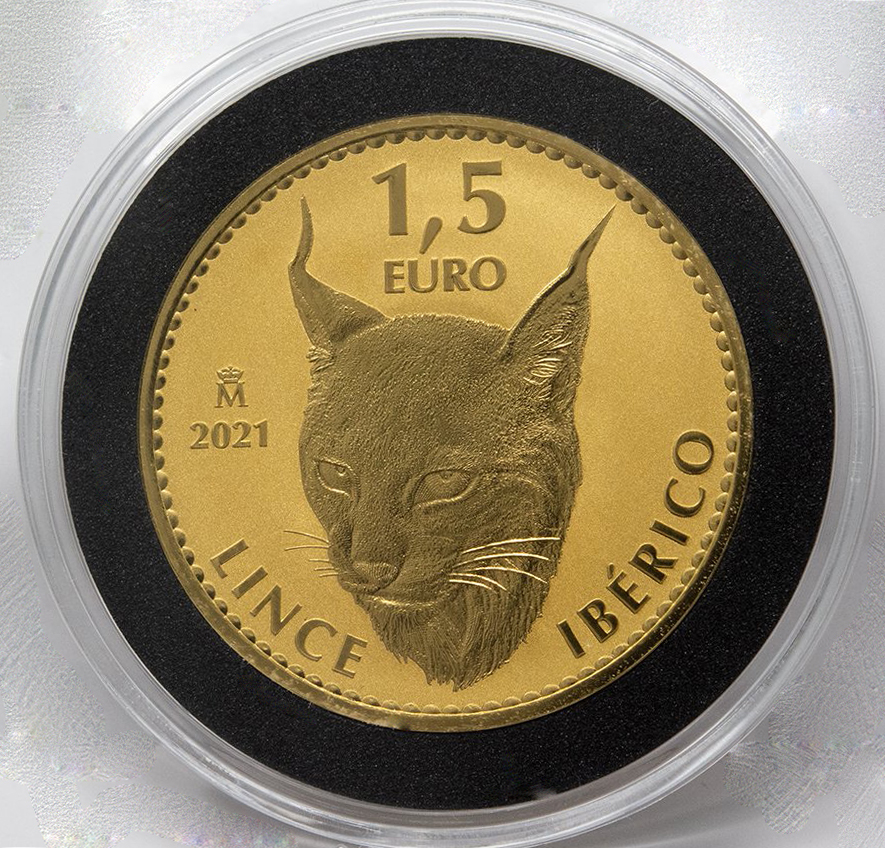
Back Spanish doubloon

== Characteristics ==
Description:

On the obverse the motifs and legends of a piece of eight, of the columnar type are reproduced: two hemispheres under the royal crown, flanked by the columns of Hercules with the motto PLUS VLTRA, all over a sea with waves. In the upper part, in a circular sense and in capital letters, appears the legend FELIPE VI REY DE ESPAÑA. At the bottom of the coin, in a circular direction, the legend 1 ONZA 999.9 ORO. The motifs and legends are surrounded by a beading of pine nuts.

An image of the head of an Iberian lynx is reproduced on the reverse. On your left the mint mark and the year of minting 2021. At the top of the coin, in two lines, the face value 1.5 EURO. At the bottom and in a circular direction, the legend LINCE IBÉRICO. The motifs and legends are surrounded by a beading of pine nuts.

Purity: 999.9 (24 karat) pure gold

Diameter: 37 millimetres (1.5 in)

Weight: 1 ounce (28 g)

== History ==
Production began in 2021 with an initial mintage of 12,000 units produced.

== Successors ==
=== 2022 ===
In 2022 the Toro (Bull) was put up for sale, with a maximum circulation of 15,000 copies and the same characteristics and value as the Lince coin. It is considered to be the same series of coins, although the motif was changed to a fighting bull, and the columnar on the obverse was redesigned. A quadruple latent image was added as a security measure on the obverse.

Also in 2022, a 1/10 ounce coin was put up for sale with a design equal to that of the Lince but with a value of 15 cents.

=== 2023 ===
In 2023, the Caballo Cartujano (Carthusian Horse) was put up for sale, with a maximum circulation of 12,000 copies and the same characteristics and value as the two previous ounce coins. The columnar used on the obverse was the same as on the Bull, leaving that design as definitive for the series. A quadruple latent image was added as a security measure on the obverse.

Also in 2023, a 1/10 ounce coin was put up for sale with a design equal to that of the Bull but with a value of 15 cents.

Lince ibérico (Spain)
- Spain
- Value: Euro
- Composition: 999.9 gold
- Years of minting: 2021–present

Obverse
- Design: Piece of eight
- Designer: Unknown

Reverse
- Design: Head of Lynx
