= Orzeł bielik =

Polish National Bank bullion coins

Orzeł bielik gold coins are a series of gold bullion coins of .9999 purity, issued by the Polish National Bank. These coins were minted on the order of the President of the Polish National Bank on 12 June 1995.

The obverse side of the coin bears the emblem of the Republic of Poland, the denomination, and date of minting. The reverse side shows a stylized silhouette of a white-tailed eagle and information about the sample and the weight of the coin. The edge is smooth. The coins are packaged in special plastic packaging. Each coin is accompanied by a certificate, along with technical data, a number, and a brief description.

Available denominations are:

- zl 50, weighing 0.1 ounces, with a diameter of 18.0& mm
- zl 100 - 0.25 oz, 22.0 mm
- zl 200 - 0.5 oz, 27.0 mm
- zl 500 - 1 oz (31, 10 g), 32.0 mm.
