= Libertad (coin) =

Mexican bullion coin

Gold Libertad
- Mexico
- Mass: 31.1 g (1.0 troy oz)
- Diameter: 34.5 mm (1.36 in)
- Thickness: 2.5 mm (0.099 in)
- Composition: 99.9% Au
- Years of minting: 1981-present

Obverse
- Design: Coat of arms of Mexico

Reverse
- Design: Three-quarter side view of the Angel of Independence with the volcanoes Popocatépetl and Iztaccíhuatl in the background

Silver Libertad
- Mexico
- Mass: 31.1 g (1.0 troy oz)
- Diameter: 40 mm (1.58 in)
- Thickness: 3.0 mm (0.12 in)
- Edge: Reeded
- Composition: 99.9% Ag
- Years of minting: 1982-present

Obverse
- Design: Coat of arms of Mexico with 10 past versions of this symbol surrounding it.

Reverse
- Design: Three-quarter side view of the Angel of Independence with the volcanoes Popocatépetl and Iztaccíhuatl in the background

The Libertad coins are silver and gold bullion coins originating from Mexico and minted by La Casa de Moneda de México (Mexican Mint). The Mexican Mint was established in 1535 and is the oldest mint in the Americas. The modern coins contain 99.9% silver or gold (.999 fineness) and are available in various sizes. Both metal coins have undergone a design change. In 1989, 3,500 1/4 ounce Libertad platinum coins were produced. Libertads are devoid of face value, yet are legal tender, still accepted as currency and guaranteed by Banco de México, based on the market value of its gold or silver content.

In addition to the bullion version, a proof and reverse proof versions for both metals are manufactured specifically for collectors. Gold coins made before 2000 are only 90% pure gold. Proof coins contain a frosted angel with a polished background. A reverse proof is the opposite and has a polished angel with a frosted background. An antique finish silver Libertad coin was first released in 2018 with a limited mintage of 40,000.

== Design ==
Obverse: The Coat of arms of Mexico is shown with a Mexican golden eagle perched on a prickly pear cactus devouring a rattlesnake. This imagery relates to the founding of Tenochtitlan, present-day Mexico City. The coat of arms is rooted in the legend where the god Huitzilopochtli told the Aztec people where to build their city: where they saw an eagle eating a snake on top of a cactus. The bottom half of the coat of arms has oak and laurel leaves encircling the eagle. The top half has the words Estados Unidos Mexicanos (United Mexican States) encircling the eagle. The gold obverse has not changed since its inception and the silver coin had the same obverse at its inception. In 2000, the silver obverse was changed to depict the current Mexican national coat of arms along with 10 past versions of this symbol surrounding it. The Spanish inscription ESTADOS UNIDOS MEXICANOS still surrounds the central coat of arms. The past version of the symbol at the top is found in the Codex Mendoza from 1524.

Reverse: The design used was based on the 1921 gold Centenario, a coin issued to mark the centennial of Mexican independence. The winged Victoria of Angel of Independence is in front with the volcanoes Popocatépetl and Iztaccihuatl in the background. The weight (ONZA or ounce), date, and purity are also listed. The older Libertad coins show a front-facing view of the angel. The new Libertad series shows a three-quarter side profile of the angel. The gold used the older angel from 1981 through 1999. The silver used the older angel from 1982 through 1995.

== Specifications ==
Gold coins have not changed sizes since first minted. From 1982 through 1995, the one, 1/2 and 1/4 ounce silver coins had slightly smaller diameters and greater thicknesses than current minted coins. From 1981 through 1990, the gold coins contained 90% gold (.90 fineness). The gold coins, since 1991, and all silver coins have contained 99.9% silver or gold (.999 fineness).

Current specifications
Composition	Weight		Diameter (mm)	Thickness (mm)
Composition	troy oz	grams	Diameter (mm)	Thickness (mm)
Gold	1	31.1	34.5	2.5
Gold	1/2	15.56	29	1.8
Gold	1/4	7.8	23	1.3
Gold	1/10	3.1	16	1.3
Gold	1/20	1.56	13	0.65
Silver	32.15	1,000	110	11.5
Silver	5	155.5	65	5.4
Silver	2	62.2	48	4.5
Silver	1	31.1	40	3
Silver	1/2	15.56	33	2.35
Silver	1/4	7.8	27	1.7
Silver	1/10	3.11	20	1.4
Silver	1/20	1.56	16	1

== Mintage statistics ==
=== Gold ===
Mintage of gold uncirculated coins
Year	1/20 oz	1/10 oz	1/4 oz	1/2 oz	1 oz
1981			313,000	193,000	596,000
1991	10,000	10,000	10,000	10,000	109,193
1992	65,225	50,777	28,106	25,220	46,281
1993	10,000	10,000	2,500	2,500	73,881
1994	10,000	10,000	2,500	2,500	1,000
2000	5,300	3,500	2,500	1,500	2,730
2002	5,000	5,000	5,000	5,000	15,000
2003	800	300	300	300	500
2004	4,000	2,000	1,500	500	3,000
2005	3,200	500	500	500	3,000
2006	3,000	2,500	1,500	500	4,000
2007	1,200	1,200	500	500	2,500
2008	800	2,500	800	300	800
2009	2,000	9,000	3,000	3,000	6,200
2010	1,500	4,500	1,500	1,500	4,000
2011	2,500	6,500	1,500	1,500	3,000
2012					3,000
2013	650	2,150	750	500	2,350
2014	1,050	2,450	1,000	1,000	4,050
2015	1,300	4,100	1,300	1,100	4,800
2016	2,900	3,800	1,000	1,200	4,100
2017	1,000	300	500	700	900
2018	2,500	1,500	1,250	1,250	2,050
2019	1,500	1,250	1,500	1,500	2,000
2020	700	700	700	700	1,100
2021	1,000	850	500	500	1,050
2022	1,100	1,400	1,300	1,000	1,900

Mintage of gold proof coinage
Year	1/20 oz	1/10 oz	1/4 oz	1/2 oz	1 oz
1983					88
1989				704	
2004	200	200	1,800	200	200
2005	400	400	3,920	720	570
2006	520	520	2,120	520	520
2007	500	500	1,500	500	500
2008	500	500	800	500	500
2009	600	600	1,700	600	600
2010	600	600	1,000	600	600
2011	1,100	1,100	2,000	1,100	1,100
2013	300	300	600	300	400
2014	250	250	250	250	250
2015	500	500	500	500	500
2016	2,100	2,100	2,100	2,100	2,100
2017	600	1,500	1,500	700	600
2018	1,000	1,500	1,000	1,000 (p); 1,000 (rp)	1,000 (p); 1,000 (rp)
2019	1,000	1,000	800	650 (p); 500 (rp)	750 (p); 500 (rp)
2020	250	250	250	250 (p); 250 (rp)	250 (p); 250 (rp)
2021	350	450	450	450 (p); 500 (rp)	500 (p); 500 (rp)
2022	1,200	1,100	1,400	1,000 (p); 500 (rp)	1,300 (p); 500 (rp)
(p) Proof; (rp) Reverse proof

=== Silver ===
Mintage of silver uncirculated coins
Year	1/20 oz	1/10 oz	1/4 oz	1/2 oz	1 oz	2 oz	5 oz	1 kg
1982					1,050,000			
1983					1,002,200			
1984					1,015,500			
1985					2,017,000			
1986					1,699,426			
1987					500,000			
1988					1,000,000			
1989					1,396,500			
1990					1,200,000			
1991	50,017	50,017	50,017	50,618	1,650,518			
1992	295,783	299,933	104,000	119,000	2,458,000			
1993	100,000	100,000	90,500	90,500	1,000,000			
1994	90,100	90,100	90,100	90,100	400,000			
1995	50,000	50,000	50,000	50,000	500,000			
1996	50,000	50,000	50,000	50,000	300,000	50,000	20,000	
1997	20,000	20,000	20,000	20,000	100,000	15,000	10,000	
1998	6,400	6,400	6,400	6,400	67,000	7,000	3,500	
1999	8,001	8,000	7,000	7,000	95,000	5,000	2,800	
2000	57,500	27,500	21,000	20,000	455,000	9,000	5,500	
2001	25,000	25,000	25,000	20,000	385,000	6,700	4,000	
2002	45,000	35,000	35,000	35,000	955,000	8,700	8,500	
2003	50,000	20,000	22,000	28,000	200,000	9,500	5,000	
2004	30,000	15,000	15,000	20,000	550,000	11,000	5,923	
2005	15,000	9,277	15,000	10,000	600,000	3,549	2,401	
2006	20,000	15,000	15,000	15,000	300,000	5,800	3,000	
2007	3,500	3,500	3,500	3,500	200,000	8,000	3,000	
2008	7,000	10,000	9,000	9,000	950,000	17,000	9,000	2,003
2009	10,000	10,000	10,000	10,000	1,650,000	46,000	21,000	4,000
2010	12,000	12,000	15,500	20,000	1,000,000	14,000	9,500	4,000
2011	15,000	15,000	15,000	30,000	1,200,000	14,000	10,000	6,000
2012	0	3,300	16,700	17,000	746,400	18,600	9,500	2,300
2013	13,500	18,900	9,600	24,500	774,100	17,400	10,400	
2014	5,700	6,350	6,950	23,000	429,200	9,000	6,400	
2015	18,400	19,900	17,900	16,000	901,500	20,100	9,500	2,000
2016	22,900	24,400	17,700	30,900	1,437,500	17,600	11,400	2,000
2017	8,550	8,850	8,100	9,050	636,000	8,900	5,050	200
2018	17,900	20,300	18,000	15,500	300,000	20,400	16,600	500
2019	7,350	7,200	5,450	8,500	402,000	18,300	18,000	200
2020	5,450	6,100	4,450	7,600	300,000	5,500	8,900	500
2021	3,600	3,900	3,250	4,500	450,000	6,500	6,050	500
2022	4,500	4,850	4,150	5,555	350,000	6,250	7,000	200

Mintage of silver proof coinage
Year	1/20 oz	1/10 oz	1/4 oz	1/2 oz	1 oz	2 oz	5 oz	1 kg
1983					998			
1986					30,006			
1987					12,000			
1988					10,000			
1989					10,000			
1990					10,000			
1991					10,000			
1992	5,000	5,000	5,000	5,000	10,000			
1993	5,002	5,002	5,002	5,002	5,002			
1994	5,002	5,002	5,002	5,002	5,002			
1995	2,000	2,000	2,000	2,000	2,000			
1996	1,000	1,000	1,000	1,000	2,000	1,200	1,200	
1997	800	800	800	800	1,500	1,300	1,300	
1998	300	300	300	2,500	500	400	400	
1999	600	600	600	600	600	280	100	
2000	900	1,000	700	700	1,600	500	500	
2001	1,500	1,500	1,000	1,000	4,100	500	1,100	
2002	2,800	2,800	2,800	2,800	3,800	1,000	1,000	1,820
2003	4,400	4,900	3,900	3,400	5,400	800	1,700	1,514
2004	2,700	2,500	2,500	2,500	3,000	1,000	600	1,501
2005	2,600	3,000	2,400	2,800	3,300	600	1,100	500
2006	3,300	3,000	2,900	2,900	4,000	1,100	1,000	874
2007	4,000	4,000	3,000	1,500	5,800	500	500	700
2008	3,300	5,000	2,900	2,500	11,000	1,000	900	1,700
2009	5,000	5,000	3,000	3,000	10,000	6,200	5,000	1,700
2010	10,000	10,000	5,000	5,000	10,000	1,300	2,000	1,500
2011	10,000	10,000	5,000	5,000	10,000	1,000	2,000	1,000
2012					4,200			500
2013	4,200	4,100	3,200	3,000	9,100	1,300	1,600	400
2014	1,850	1,950	1,700	1,750	4,700	750	800	500
2015	5,500	5,300	2,400	2,500	6,400 (p) 1,500 (rp)	1,300	1,600	500
2016	12,550	12,650	9,550	13,150	13,250 (p); 1,500 (rp)	3,950	2,750	800
2017	9,050	7,850	4,850	12,750	8,650 (p); 1,050 (rp)	3,050 (p); 2,000 (rp)	2,350 (p); 2,000 (rp)	500 (pl); 1,000 (ehrpl)
2018	7,900	6,500	5,000	7,000	10,000 (p); 1,500 (rp); 40,000 (af)	5,000 (p); 2,100 (rp); 2,000 (af)	5,000 (p); 2,100 (rp); 2,000 (af)	1,000
2019	3,000	3,600	2,850	2,000	5,500 (p); 1,000 (rp); 1,000 (af)	2,750 (p); 1,000 (rp); 1,000 (af)	2,500 (p); 1,000 (rp); 1,000 (af)	500
2020	2,800	3,450	2,700	2,000	5,850 (p); 1,000 (rp)	2,800 (p); 1,000 (rp)	2,950 (p); 1,000 (rp)	250
2021	2,250	3,200	1,500	1,700	3,340 (p); 1,000 (rp)	1,250 (p); 1,000 (rp)	1,250 (p); 1,000 (rp)	250
2022	2,750	2,650	1,400	1,250	3,400 (p); 1,000 (rp)	1,700 (p); 1,000 (rp)	1,700 (p); 1,000 (rp)	200
(p) Proof; (rp) Reverse proof (af) Antique finish; (pl) Proof like; (ehrpl) Enhanced High Relief Proof-Like

== Gallery ==
Previous coin designs

Obverse of the 1982-1999 design showing the coat of arms of Mexico

Reverse of the 1982-1995 design showing frontal view of the Angel of Independence with the volcanoes Popocatépetl and Iztaccíhuatl

== See also ==
- Bullion
- Bullion coin
- Gold as an investment
- Inflation hedge
- Silver as an investment
