= Perth Mint =

Australia's official bullion mint, situated in Perth, Western Australia

The Perth Mint
- Headquarters: 310 Hay Street, East Perth, Perth, Western Australia, Australia
- Key people: David Michael (Minister); Paul Graham (CEO)
- Revenue: ▲ A$32.9B (2025)
- Net income: ▲ A$10.9M (2025)
- Total assets: ▲ A$11.1B (2025)
- Total equity: ▲ A$227M (2025)
- Owner: Government of Western Australia
- Number of employees: ▼691 (2025)
- Parent: Gold Corporation
- Building details
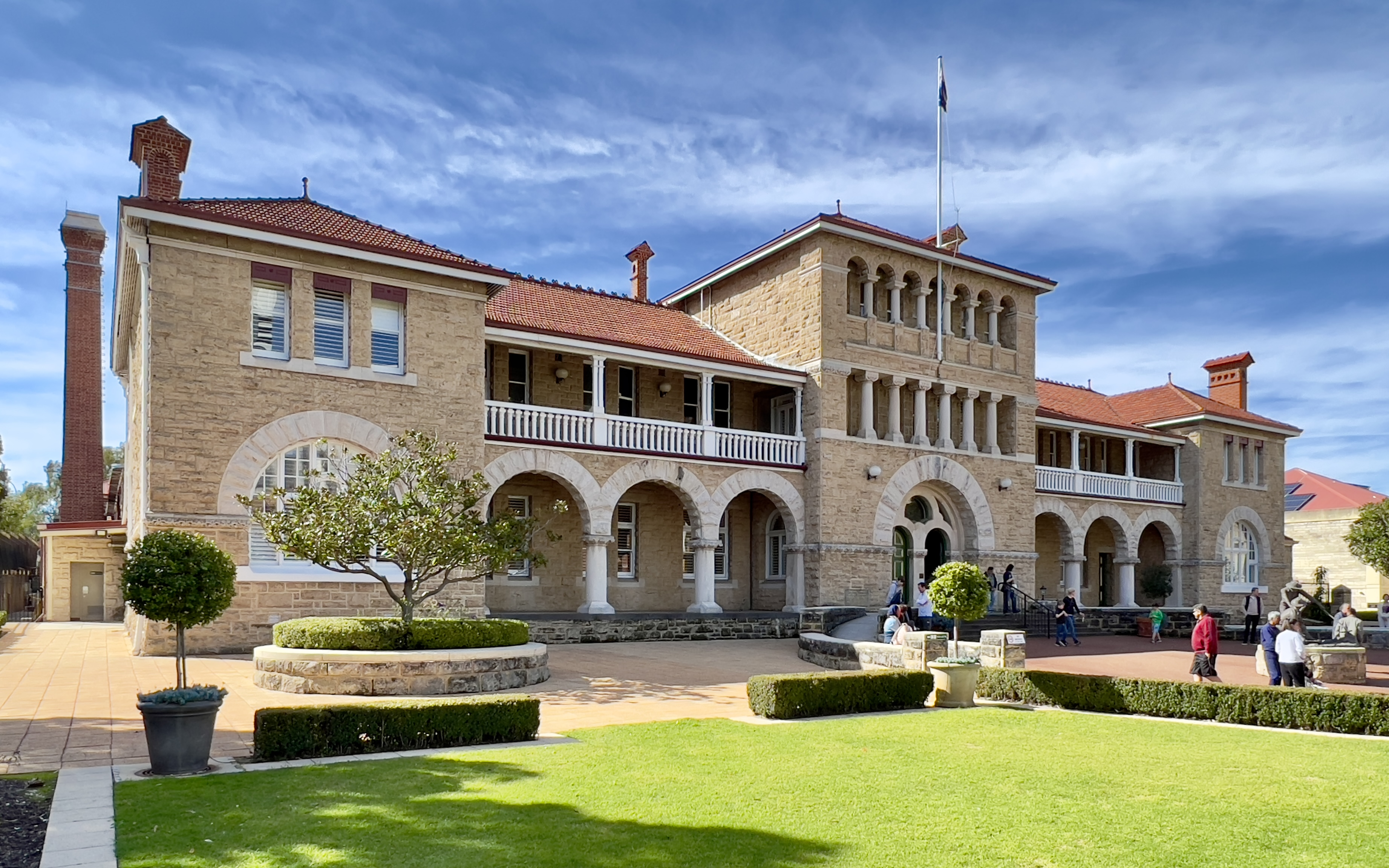
- Perth Mint

General information
- Location: Hay Street, East Perth, Western Australia
- Coordinates: 31°57′26″S 115°52′09″E
- Opened: 20 June 1899

Design and construction
- Architect: George Temple-Poole

Western Australia Heritage Register
- Type: State Registered Place
- Designated: 15 December 2000
- Reference no.: 2166
- Website: www.perthmint.com
- Footnotes; Fiscal Year 2025 (FY25) is 1 July 2024 to 30 June 2025. Source: Annual Report

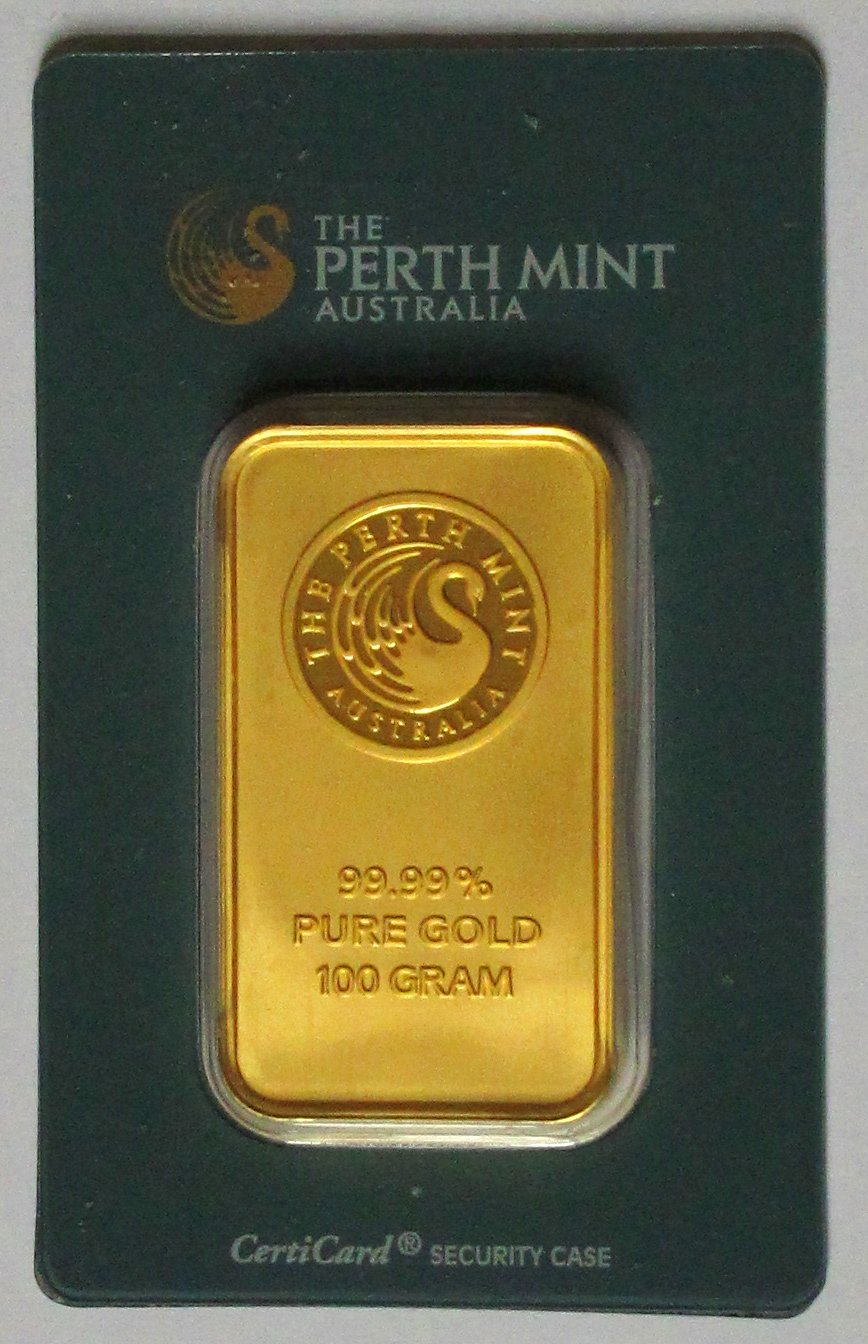
Gold ingot from the Perth Mint

The Perth Mint is Australia's official bullion mint and wholly owned by the Government of Western Australia. Established on 20 June 1899, two years before Australia's Federation in 1901, the Perth Mint was the last of three Australian colonial branches of the United Kingdom's Royal Mint (after the now-defunct Sydney Mint and Melbourne Mint) intended to refine gold from the gold rushes and to mint gold sovereigns and half-sovereigns for the British Empire. Along with the Royal Australian Mint, which produces coins of the Australian dollar for circulation, the Perth Mint is the older of Australia's two mints issuing coins that are legal tender.

== History ==
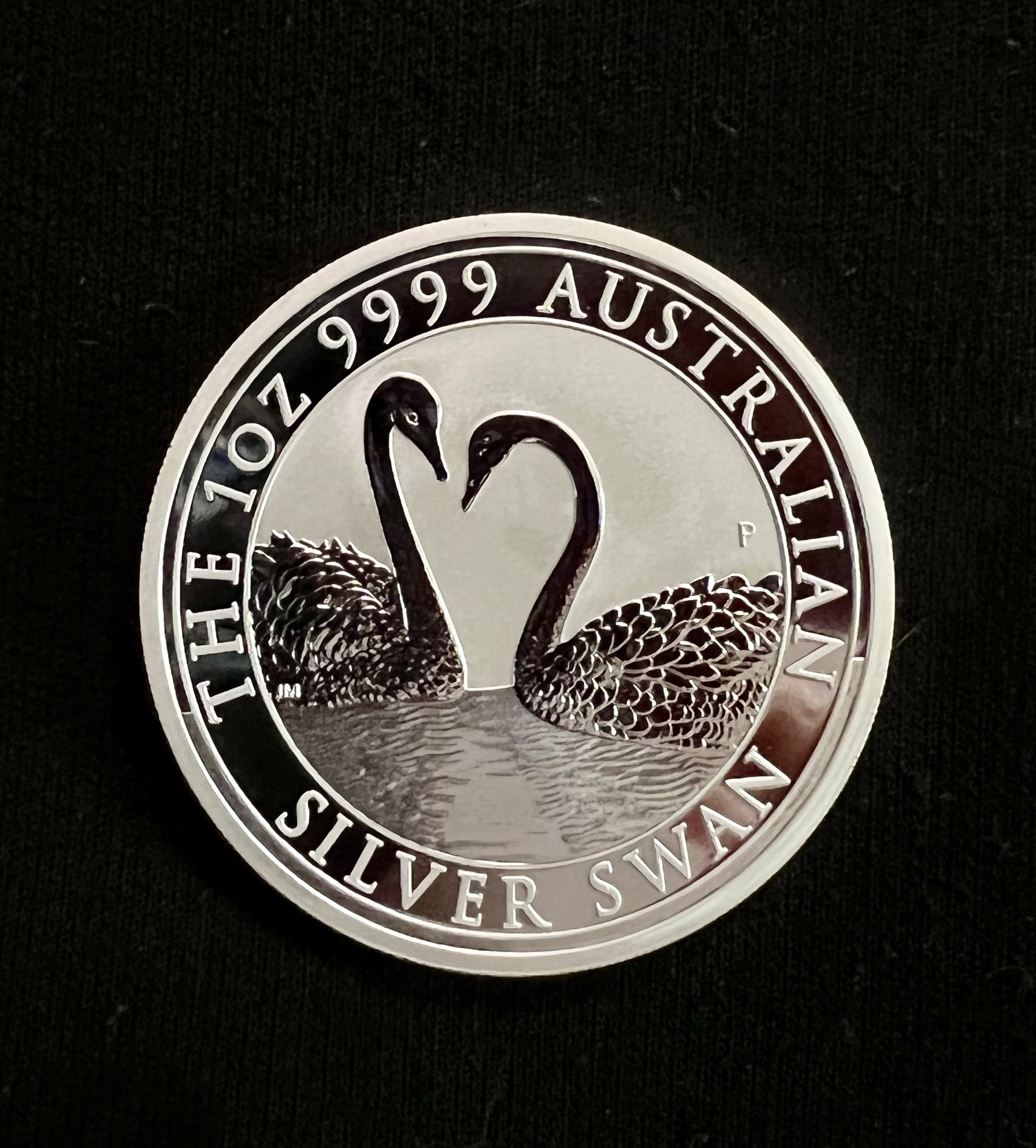
Reverse 2022 Australia 31-gram (1 ozt) Silver Swan Perth Mint

Perth Mint, as a business entity, was established during the 1890s, as a subsidiary of the Royal Mint in the United Kingdom.

The foundation stone of the mint building was laid in 1896 by John Forrest. The building was officially opened on 20 June 1899. At that time, the population of Western Australia (WA) was growing rapidly (23,000 in 1869 and 180,000 in 1900) due to the discovery of rich gold deposits at Coolgardie, Kalgoorlie and the Murchison region.

The mint initially served two purposes. Firstly, it minted coins for circulation in WA – this had previously been done externally, and as a result, there had often been insufficient currency in circulation. Secondly, the mint bought the vast majority of gold mined in WA; at the time, a large proportion of mining was done by "diggers" (prospectors and/or small-scale, independent miners), who had migrated to WA in thousands from other parts of Australia and overseas. Mining businesses were able to sell their raw gold directly to the mint, where it was made into gold coins and bullion.

Although WA took part in the Federation of the Australian colonies in 1901, the mint remained under the control of the UK government for a further 69 years. On 1 July 1970, ownership was acquired by the state government of Western Australia, as a statutory authority under the Perth Mint Act 1970.

In the 32 years up to 1931, the Perth Mint struck more than 106 million gold sovereigns, and nearly 735,000 half-sovereigns (intermittently between 1900 and 1920), for use as currency in Australia and throughout the British Empire. The mint stopped making gold sovereigns when Britain abandoned the gold standard in 1931. Nevertheless, the refinery remained busy as staff turned their skills to making fine gold bullion bars. But it was not long before the Perth Mint was involved again in the production of coins. During World War II, the Perth Mint began minting the Australian coinage from base metals. Up until the end of 1983, the Perth Mint also manufactured much of Australia's lower-denomination coin currency.

The Perth Mint achieved "arguably the purest of all gold" in 1957 when the mint produced a 13-troy-ounce (400 g) proof plate of almost six nines. It was verified by the Goldsmiths' Company and deemed to have results of "nearly 999.999 parts per 1000". The Royal Mint was so impressed that it ordered some of the gold as the benchmark for its own standards.

The mint's new direction was formalised in 1987 with the creation of Gold Corporation by the Gold Banking Corporation Act 1987. Under a unique agreement with the Commonwealth of Australia's Department of the Treasury, the Perth Mint's new operator was empowered to mint and market gold, silver and platinum Australian legal tender coinage to investors and collectors worldwide. Prime Minister Bob Hawke launched the Australian Nugget Gold Coins Series in 1987. The first day's trading yielded sales of 155 thousand troy ounces (4.8 tonnes) of gold worth A$103 million, equivalent to A$282.4 million in 2022, well above the sales target of 130 thousand troy ounces (4.0 tonnes) to the end of June.

Up to 2000, the Perth Mint's refined gold output totalled 4.5 thousand tonnes (9.9 million pounds), representing 3.25% of the total weight of gold produced by humankind. This is about the current holdings of gold bullion in the United States Bullion Depository at Fort Knox.

In 2003, the Perth Mint officially opened an 8,400-square-metre (90,000 sq ft) state-of-the-art manufacturing facility next door to its original limestone building.

== One tonne gold coin ==
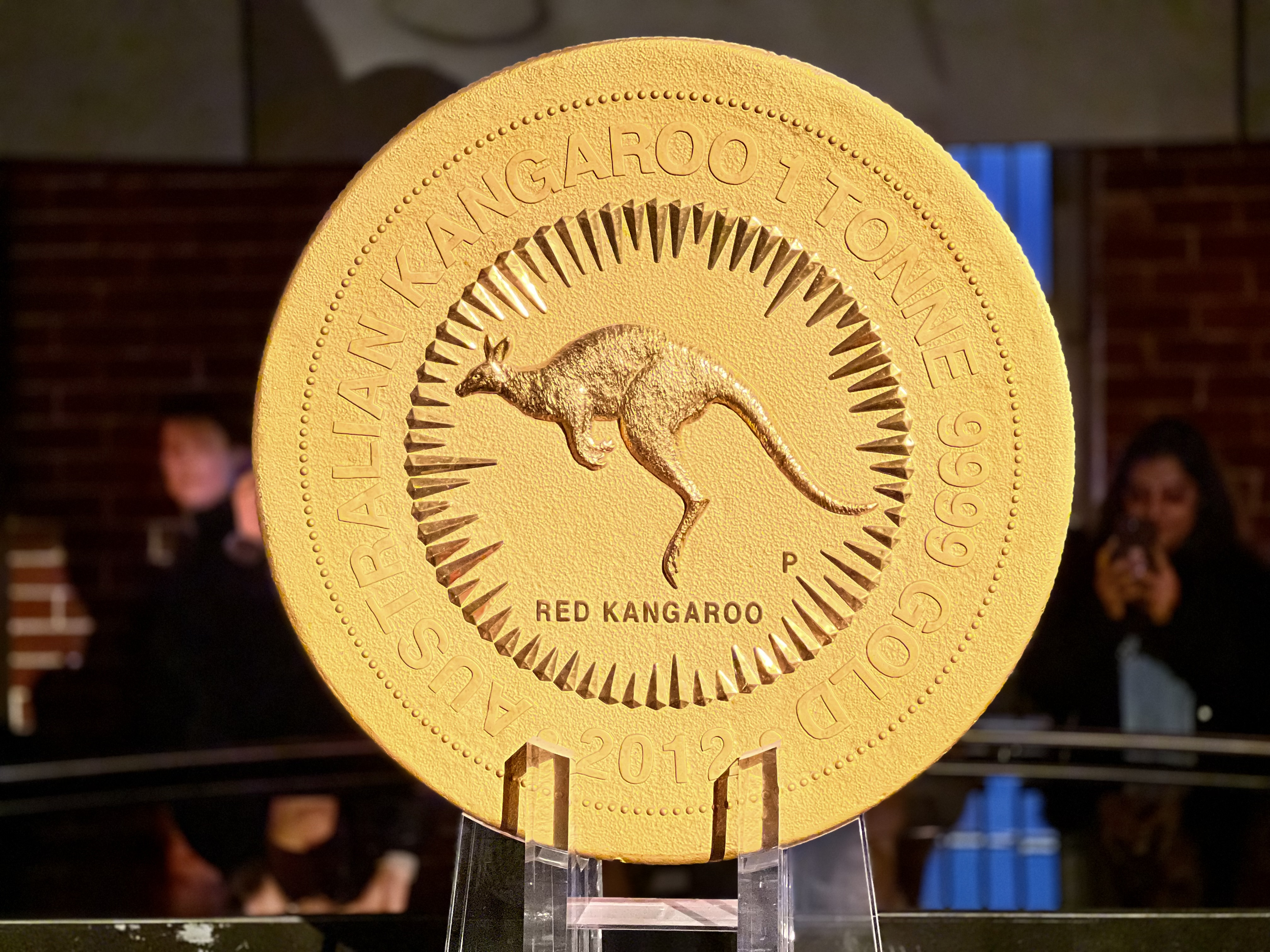
One tonne gold coin in the Perth Mint

In October 2011, the Perth Mint created the world's largest, heaviest and most valuable gold coin, breaking the record previously held by the Royal Canadian Mint. The coin is approximately 80 centimetres (31 in) in diameter and 12 centimetres (4.7 in) thick, and made of 1,012 kilograms (2,231 lb) of 99.99% pure gold. It features, on the obverse side, the effigy of Elizabeth II, and a red kangaroo on the reverse side. It is legal tender in Australia with face value A$1 million, but at the time of minting it was valued at A$53.5 million, equivalent to A$68.6 million in 2022.

Today, the Perth Mint continues to provide refining and other services to the gold industry and manufactures many coin related numismatic items for investors and coin collectors. It is responsible for manufacturing and marketing most of Australia's legal tender precious metal coins, including proof quality Australian Nugget gold coins, Australian Platinum Koala coins, Australian Silver Kookaburra coins, Swan series coins and bullion.

As of November 2019, the Perth Mint refines approximately 79 percent of the Australasian market's gold production and 30 percent of silver at a separate secured facility outside the city centre. It mints coins and bars from both Australian gold and metal sourced from other countries, representing 10 percent of the global production. It sold about A$18.9 billion in pure gold, silver, and platinum bullion bars and coins in 2018.

== Gold-backed digital assets ==
The Perth Mint Gold Token (PMGT) was a digital asset offered from 2019 to 2023 by Singapore-based Trovio (formerly Infinigold), using the Perth Mint name under licence. Each PMGT was backed 1:1 by GoldPass accounts held by Trovio at the Perth Mint. The PMGT was discontinued in late 2023.

GoldPass was a smartphone application launched in 2018 by the Perth Mint. The app allowed users to buy, sell and trade digital certificates representing physical gold or silver held at the Perth Mint.

== Trail ==
A collaboration known as the Gold Industry Group began a Heart of Gold Discovery Trail in Perth in October 2018. The project included the Perth Mint as a partner. (Note: The 'community Initiative' included: Ramelius Resources, Gold Fields, Northern Star Resources, Mining Education Australia, Gold Road Resources, City of Kalgoorlie-Boulder, St Barbara, Anglogold Ahanti Australia and Saracen Mineral Holdings.)

== Controversy ==
In March 2023, the Perth Mint responded to claims from the Australian Broadcasting Corporation's Four Corners program that it had faced the prospect of recalling one-kilogram (2.2 lb) bars worth $9 billion from China in 2018. The Perth Mint refuted the allegations, stating a small number of bars did not meet the non-gold specifications of the Shanghai Gold Exchange, which require that the non-gold component – that is, 0.01% of the bar or 100 parts per million (ppm) – contains no more than 50 ppm silver. The London Bullion Market Association (LBMA) launched an Incident Review Process into the Perth Mint and concluded it did not find any instances of zero tolerance non-conformance.

In June 2020, an investigation by the Australian Financial Review found that Perth Mint had purchased annually from a convicted killer in Papua New Guinea. The Western Australian corruption watchdog launched an investigation. On 27 July it was reported that HSBC and JP Morgan stopped buying gold from Perth Mint, citing potential damage to their reputation. On 10 August, a LBMA probe into the Perth Mint found no serious examples of misconduct.

Further investigation into the Perth Mint has exposed a secret recording of the Perth Mint CEO Richard Hayes and the failure to refer allegations of impropriety to the Western Australian Corruption and Crime Commission in late 2017. This has resulted in the corruption watchdog launching an investigation into the Perth Mint.

=== Operation Atlantis ===
International enforcement sources confirmed in October 2020 that Euro Pacific Bank was the target of Operation Atlantis, an international tax probe by the Joint Chiefs of Global Tax Enforcement, a task force made up of the tax offices of Australia, the United States, the United Kingdom, the Netherlands, and Canada, that was set up after the Panama Papers leak in 2016. The Perth Mint partnered with Euro Pacific Bank to allow the bank's customers to buy gold. The Perth Mint was also reportedly probed by the Australian Taxation Office in January 2020.

On 20 October 2020, the Australian Financial Review reported that the Perth Mint allowed clients of a tax haven bank, which was being investigated for its links with global organised crime syndicates, to purchase more than $100 million of gold without conducting the identity checks required to prevent money laundering. On 30 August 2022, Australia's financial crimes regulator, AUSTRAC, appointed an external auditor to investigate concerns about how the Perth Mint complies with its obligations under Australian money laundering legislation.

=== Tax havens ===
In July 2020, an article in the Australian Financial Review revealed that the Perth Mint had signed the Bank of Cyprus as a customer despite the US State Department declaring Cyprus a "major money laundering jurisdiction" and warning about its links to Russian organised crime. It also granted approved dealer status to Euro Pacific Bank, from the British Virgin Islands, and Swiss private bank, BFI Consulting. All three institutions provide offshore banking services to clients who may be seeking to avoid tax or disguise the true ownership of their assets.

=== Data breach ===
In September 2018, the Perth Mint defended its decision not to make disclosure announcements to the Australian Securities Exchange (ASX) and New York Stock Exchange (NYSE) on the grounds the breach did not relate to its ASX-listed PMGold nor NYSE-listed AAAU investment products.

=== Child labour ===
In June 2020, the Perth Mint said it would stop processing metal from artisanal and small-scale miners after allegations that it took gold dug in Papua New Guinea using child labour and toxic mercury.

== See also ==
- Bullion coin
- Gold as an investment
- Hints to Prospectors and Owners of Treatment Plants
- History of Western Australia
- Inflation hedge
- Perth Mint Swindle
- Silver as an investment

== Sources ==
- Athol, Thomas (1989). 90 Golden Years, The story of the Perth Mint. Gold Corporation. LCCN 91178365. OL 1629940M.
- "Perth mint unveils $53m coin". The Australian. AAP. 27 October 2011. Archived from the original on 19 March 2014.
- Barton, Susanne (15 February 2019). "The Perth Mint Has Recast This Gold Bar More Than 65,000 Times". Bloomberg. Archived from the original on 24 April 2020.
- "Australia unveils world's largest gold coin in Perth". BBC News. 27 October 2011.
- Bourke, Keane; Carmody, James (20 March 2023). "Company Running Perth Mint Cryptocurrency Withdraws Support, but Questions Linger Over Future of Goldpass App". ABC News. Australian Broadcasting Corporation. Archived from the original on 12 May 2023. "The company that runs the Perth Mint's cryptocurrency has announced it will no longer support the digital tokens because of alleged breaches of Australian and US laws by the taxpayer-owned organisation, in a move understood to have surprised the mint."
- Lucas, Jarrod; Landgrafft, Tara de (6 June 2025). "London gold executive says Perth Mint 'well regarded', two years after damaging reports". ABC News. Australian Broadcasting Corporation. Archived from the original on 7 June 2025. "'The bars that were in question previously were around the 99.992 or 99.993 mark, [...] but we never believed we were intentionally doping the bars under the standards.'"
- Annual Report 2025 (PDF) (Report). East Perth: Gold Corporation. 18 September 2024.
- "World's biggest gold coin worth $53m". The Sydney Morning Herald. AAP. 27 October 2011. Archived from the original on 14 June 2025.
