= Bullion coin =

Type of coin struck from precious metal

Bullion coin or specie refers to coin struck from bullion (namely, highly refined precious metal) and kept as a store of value or an investment rather than used in day-to-day commerce, or collectable, with numismatic value beyond that of its metal content. A bullion coin is distinguished by its weight (or mass) and fineness on the coin. Unlike rounds, bullion coins are minted by government mints and have a legal tender face value. Bullion coins can have fineness ranging from 91.9% (22 karat) to 99.99% purity (24 karat).

In the United Kingdom coins deemed to be investment coins are exempt from value-added tax (VAT) on transactions. A coin is considered to be an investment coin if it was minted after 1800, and at least 900 thousandths fine, and has been legal tender in its country of origin, and not normally sold at more than 180% of the value of its precious metal content; or if it is on a long list of coins deemed to be investment coins. Under United States law, "coins" not stamped by authority of the government are not coins and must be advertised as "rounds" instead.

Bullion coins may sell for a premium over the market price of the metal on the commodities exchanges. Reasons include their comparative small size and the costs associated with manufacture, storage and distribution. The amount of the premium varies depending on the coin's type and weight and the precious metal. The premium also is affected by prevailing demand. Depending on a number of factors, numismatic value may also have a direct influence on the price of a bullion coin.

The American Eagle and Canadian Maple Leaf series are the only coins available in gold, silver, platinum, and palladium.

== Examples ==
Notable examples of bullion coins include:

- (United States) American Buffalo
- (United Kingdom) Britannias
- (United States) Eagles
- (Australia) Kangaroos
- (South Africa) Krugerrands
- (Mexico) Libertades
- (Canada) Maple Leafs
- (Armenia) Noah's Arks
- (Poland) Orzel Bielik
- (China) Pandas
- (Austria) Philharmonics
- (United Kingdom) Sovereigns
- (Spain) Spanish Lynx

== See also ==
- Bullion – Gold, silver, or other precious metals in the form of bars or ingots
- Gold coin – Form of coinage
- Inflation hedge – Investment intended to protect an investor against inflation or hedge
- List of bullion coins
- Palladium coin – Bullion coin made of palladium metal
- Platinum coin – Coin in platinum metal
- Silver coin – Form of coinage
