= Manx pound =

Currency of the Isle of Man, at par with sterling

Punt Manninagh (Manx) IMP

ISO 4217
- Code: none (GBP unofficially)

Unit
- Plural
- Symbol: £

Denominations
- Subunit
- 1/100: penny
- Plural
- penny: pence
- Symbol
- penny: p
- Banknotes: £1, £5, £10, £20, £50
- Coins: 1p, 2p, 5p, 10p, 20p, 50p, £1, £2, £5

Demographics
- User(s): Isle of Man (Note: (alongside sterling))

Issuance
- Treasury: Isle of Man Treasury
- Website: www.gov.im/treasury

Valuation
- Inflation: 3.6%
- Source: The World Factbook, 2004
- Pegged with: Pound sterling

The pound (abbreviation: IMP; sign: £), or Manx pound (Manx: Punt Manninagh; in order to distinguish it from other similar-named currencies), is the currency of the Isle of Man, at parity with sterling. The Manx pound is divided into 100 pence. Notes and coins, denominated in pounds and pence, are issued by the Isle of Man Government.

== Parity with sterling ==
The Isle of Man is in a one-sided de facto currency union with the United Kingdom: the Manx government has made sterling currency legal tender on the island, and backs its own notes and coins with Bank of England notes.

Manx government notes may, on demand, be exchanged at par for Bank of England notes of equivalent value at any office of the Isle of Man Bank. All notes and coins that are legal tender in any part of the United Kingdom (e.g. Bank of England notes) are legal tender within the Isle of Man.

Unlike Northern Irish and Scottish notes, the UK does not require the Isle of Man government to back the Manx notes and coins with Bank of England notes or securities. There is no restriction under British law on the number of notes and coins they may issue, but equally Manx notes are not legal currency in the UK as they have not been approved by the British Parliament. The notes and coins are not underwritten by the UK government or the Bank of England, and there is no guarantee of convertibility beyond that given by the Manx authorities. However, the requirement in the island's Currency Act 1992 for the Isle of Man Treasury to exchange Manx Pound banknotes on demand for Bank of England notes in practice restricts the issue of unbacked currency, and the aggregate total of notes issued must be pre-approved by Tynwald.

ISO 4217 does not include a currency code for the Manx pound, but the abbreviation IMP may be seen. ("IM" is the ISO 3166-1 alpha-2 code allocated to the Isle of Man.)

== History ==
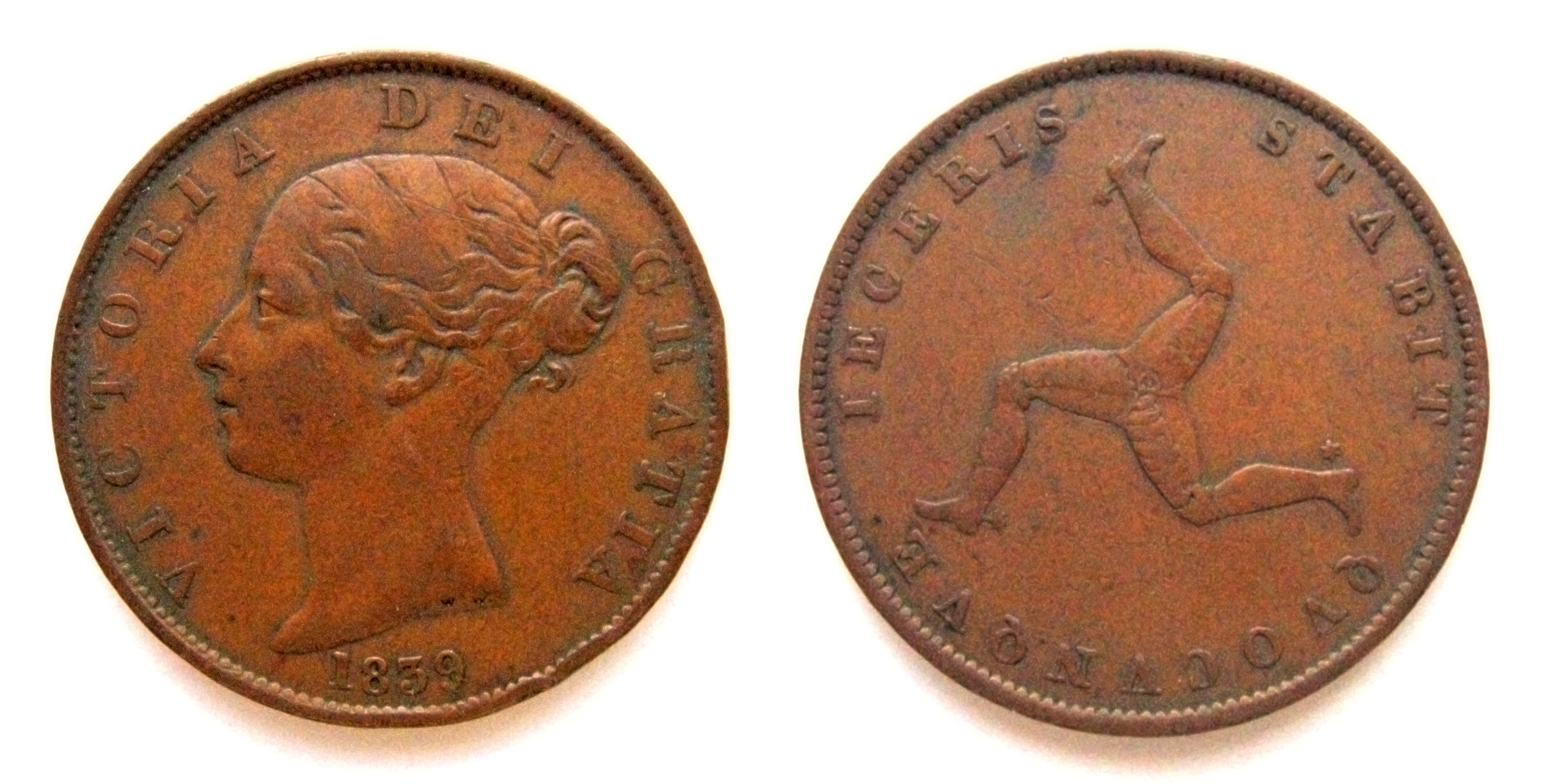
Isle of Man penny 1839

The first Manx coinage was issued privately in 1668 by John Murrey, a Douglas merchant, consisting of pennies equal in value to their English counterparts. These "Murrey Pennies" were made legal tender in 1679, when Tynwald outlawed the unofficial private coinage that had been circulating prior to and alongside John Murrey's pennies (English coinage was also allowed by this Act).

Due to the difficulty of maintaining the supply of coins on the island, in 1692, the Manx coinage was debased, with sterling crowns circulating at 5 shillings 4 pence, half-crowns at 2 shillings 8 pence and guineas at 22 shillings. At that time, Tynwald also forbade the removal of money from the island, in an attempt to maintain supply.

In 1696, a further devaluation occurred, with all English silver and gold coins valued at 14 Manx pence for every shilling. Between 1696 and 1840, Manx copper coins circulated alongside first English, and later British silver and gold coins at the rate of 14 pence to 1 shilling. As in England, there were 20 shillings to the pound. Thus, after 1696, £100 sterling was worth £116 13s 4d Manx.

In 1708, the Isle of Man Government approached the Royal Mint and requested that coinage be issued for the island. The then Master of the Mint, Sir Isaac Newton, refused. As a result, the first government issue of coins on the island was in 1709. This coinage was made legal tender on 24 June 1710. In 1733 Tynwald prohibited the circulation of any "base" (not silver or gold) coinage other than that issued by the Government.

Because of the similarity between Manx and British coins, it was profitable to change shillings to Manx coinage and pass it off as British currency in Great Britain, making a profit of £2 for every £12 in Manx coinage so transferred. This happened on such a scale that by 1830 the island was almost totally deprived of copper coinage.

In an attempt to resolve this problem, a proposal was introduced to abandon the separate Manx coinage in favour of British coins. This was rejected by the House of Keys in 1834, but they were overruled by the British government in 1839. An Act was passed declaring that "… the currency of Great Britain shall be and become, and is hereby declared to be, the currency of the Isle of Man", and this remains Manx law to this day. This change was resented: some islanders felt defrauded, and there was serious rioting in Douglas and Peel. These were known as the "Copper Row" riots, and were put down by the Manx militia.

The Royal Mint issued a total of £1,000 in copper coins. Following Tynwald's passing of the Copper Currency Act 1840, these were valued at 12 pence to the shilling. All coins issued before 1839 were declared by this law to be no longer current, and were recalled by the Board of Customs and exchanged by the Royal Mint at their original nominal value for the new coinage. After 1839, no further Manx coins were issued, and they gradually became scarce and were replaced in general circulation on the island by the coinage of the United Kingdom. They did not cease to be legal coinage on Mann until decimalisation in 1971. Banknotes had been privately issued for the island since 1865.

In 1971 the United Kingdom moved to a decimal currency, with the pound subdivided into 100 pence. The Isle of Man Government, having issued its own banknotes for ten years, took the opportunity to approach the Royal Mint and request its own versions of the decimal coins, which were introduced in 1971.

== Coins ==
=== Murrey pennies ===
The "Murrey Pennies" of 1668 were the first to depict the 'triskeles' symbol and the Island motto Quocunque Gesseris Stabit [sic], both of which have continued to feature on Manx coinage until the present day (the motto was corrected to Quocunque Jeceris Stabit in the early 18th century).

=== Government coins ===
In 1709, pennies (£300 in total) and halfpennies (£200 in total) were introduced. More of these coins were issued in 1733 (£250 in pennies, £150 in halfpennies). These issues of coins have the crest of the Stanley family, Lords of Mann, on the obverse (an eagle and child on a cap), together with the Stanley family motto, Sans Changer. The 1709 issue was a poor quality casting produced in England; the 1733 issue was a higher-quality struck coin produced at Castletown.

An updated issue of Manx coinage was produced in 1758, totalling £400. It replaced the crest of the Stanley family with a depiction of the ducal coronet of the Duke of Atholl above the monogram letters A.D. (for the Latin: Atholl Dux).

In 1786, a new design of coinage was issued, with the head of King George III (now the Lord of Mann) and the English state motto on the obverse and the triskeles and Manx motto on the reverse. The standard Lewis Pingo portrait of the king was used, the same as on the British coinage, which showed the king with a laurel wreath instead of a crown.

There were further issues in 1798 and 1813. Like the previous coins, they were the same size and material (copper) as the English coins and would easily pass for them; however as Manx pennies were 14 to the shilling they were worth less than their English counterparts.

In 1839, following the revaluation to 12 pence per shilling, the Royal Mint issued copper farthings, halfpennies and pennies which were similar to the previous designs but updated with the head of Queen Victoria. These were the last coins issued for the Isle of Man until 1971.

Duke of Atholl coin; Bank 1/2d; Victoria 1d

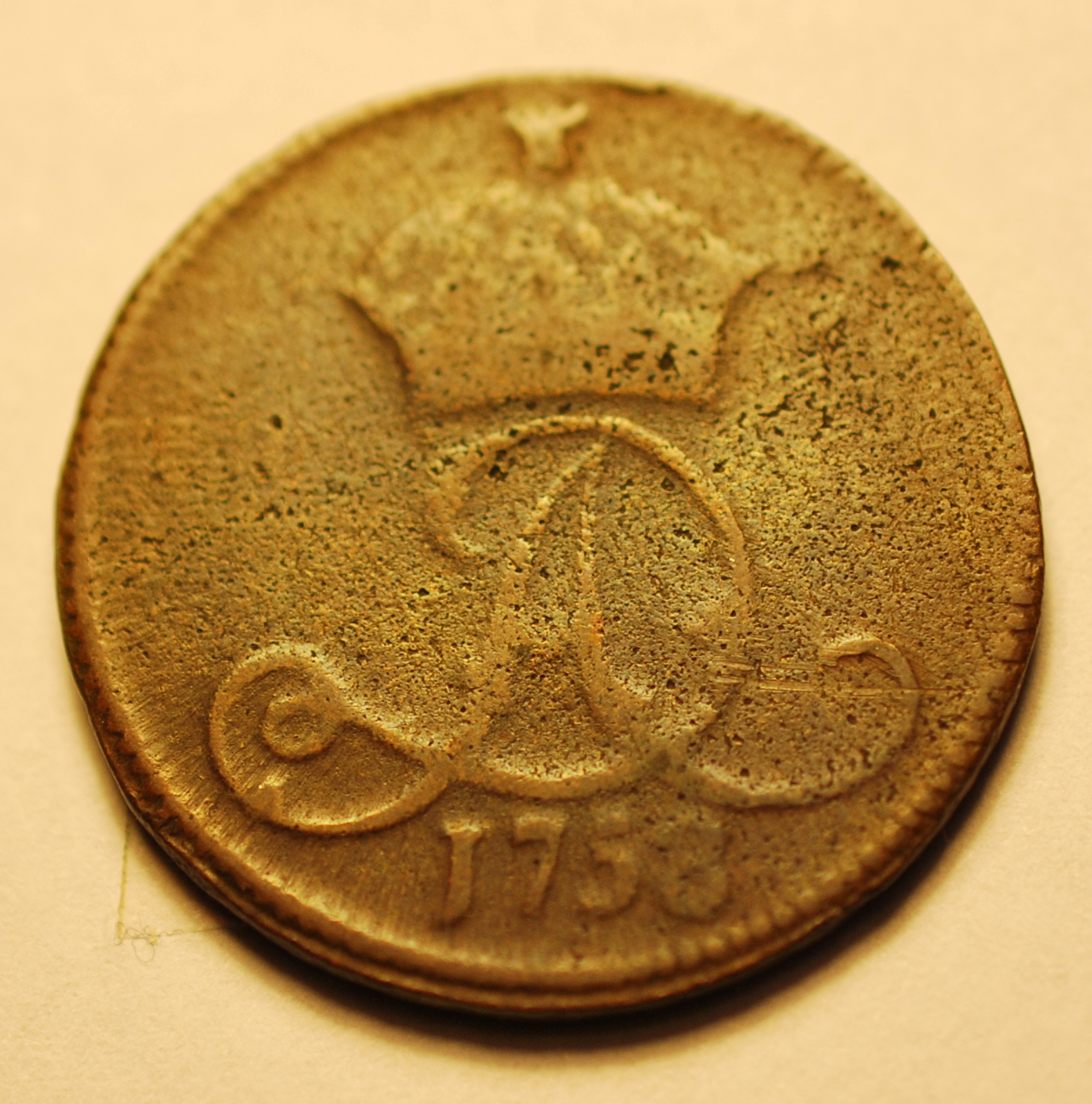

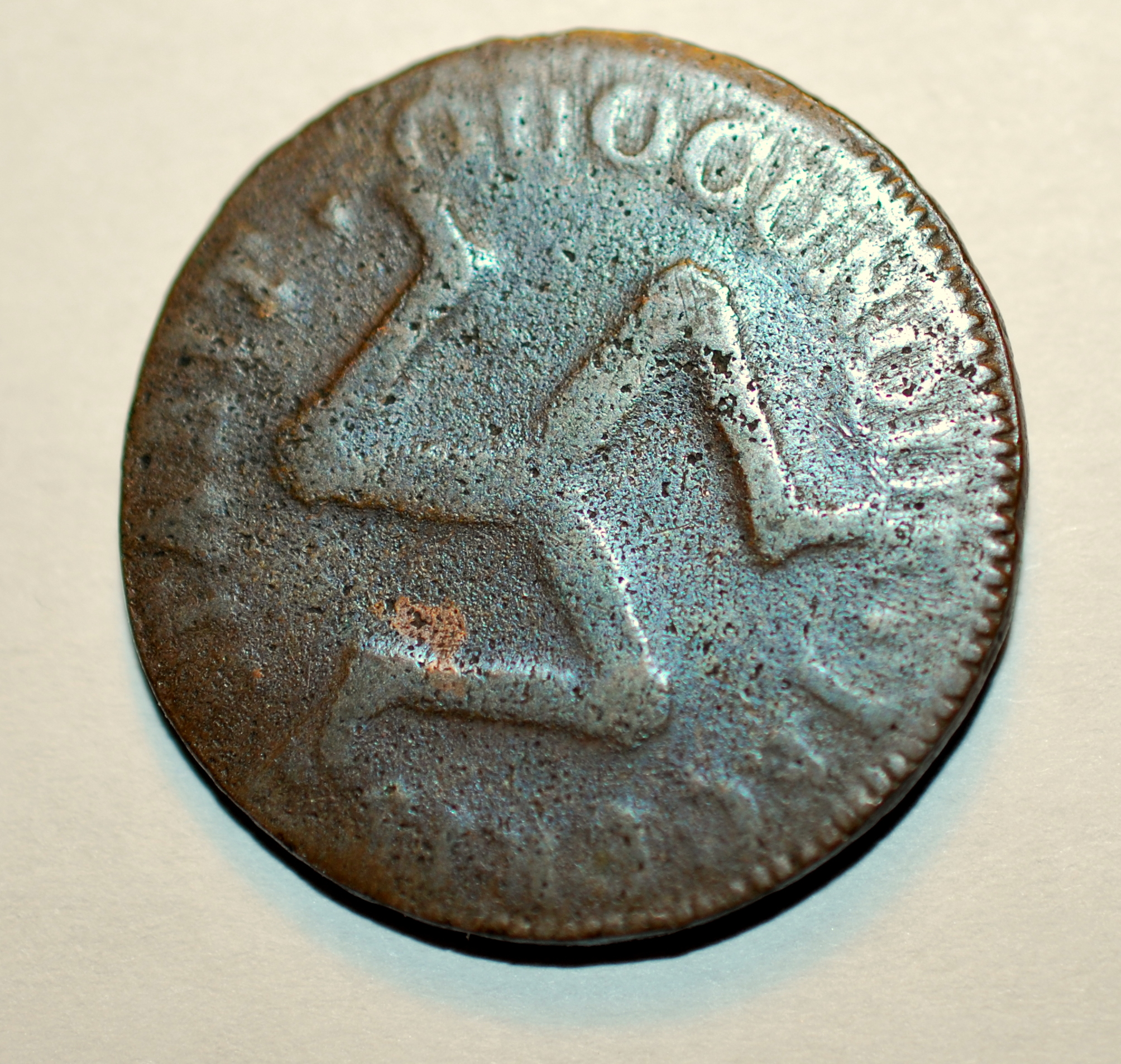

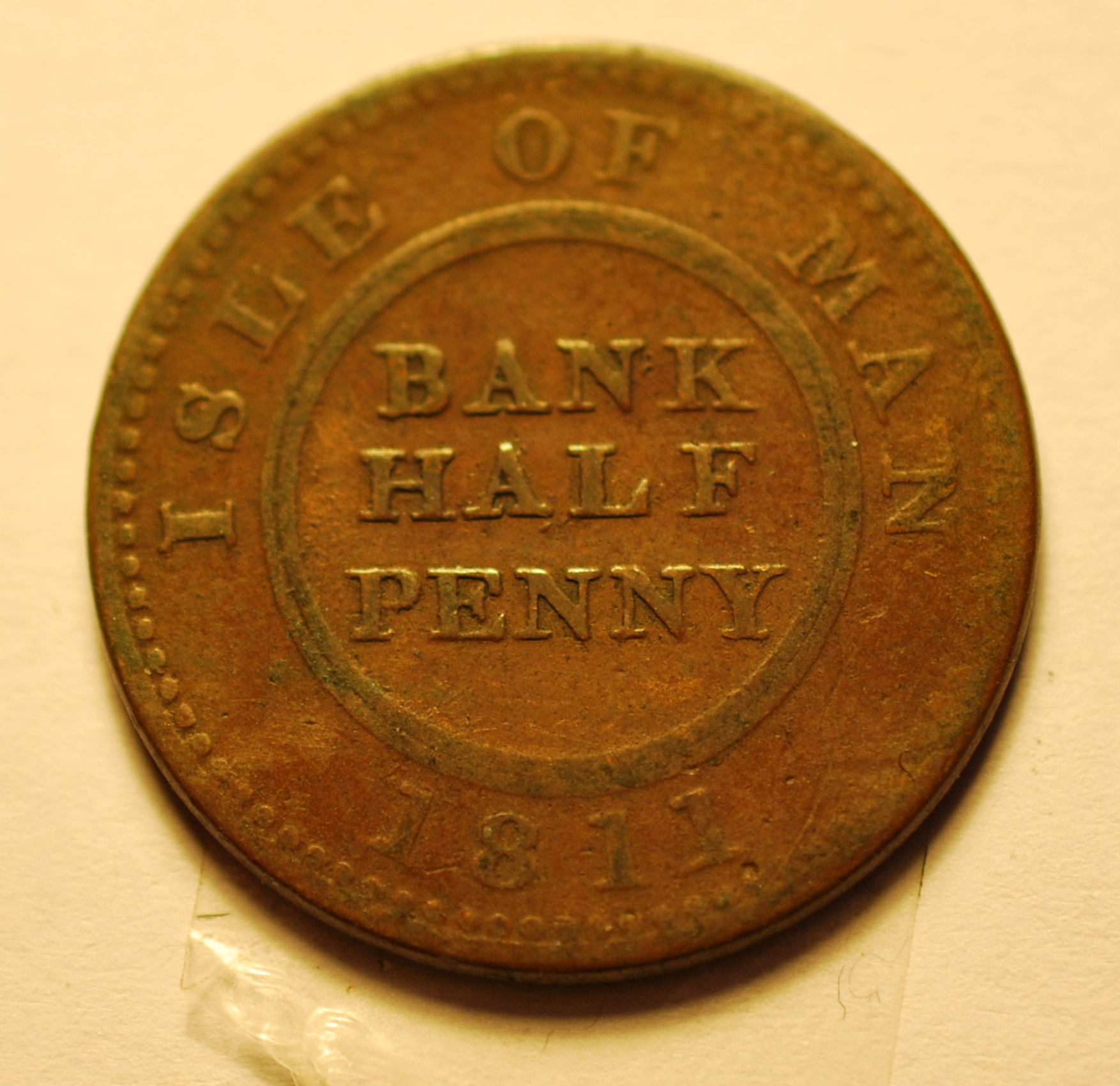

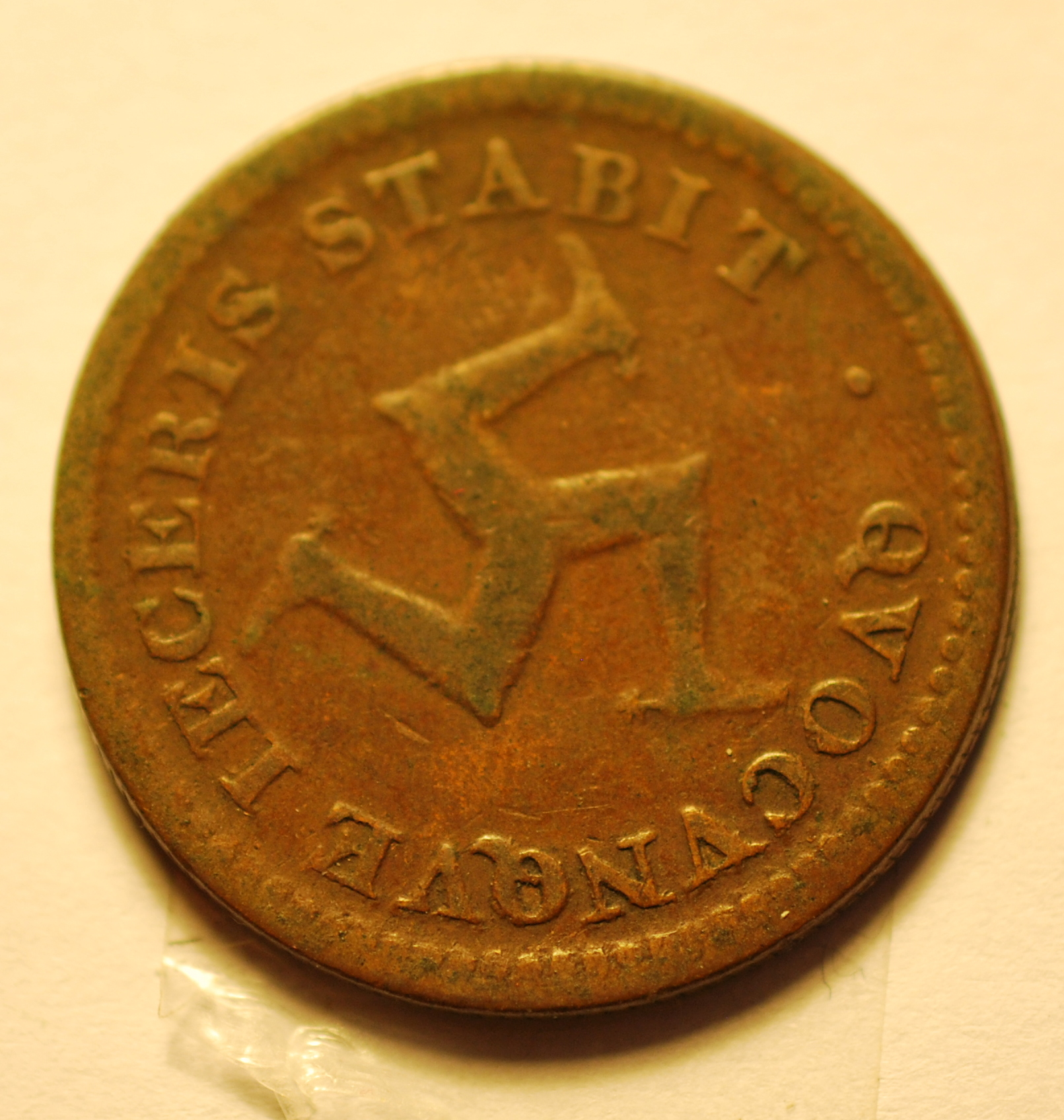

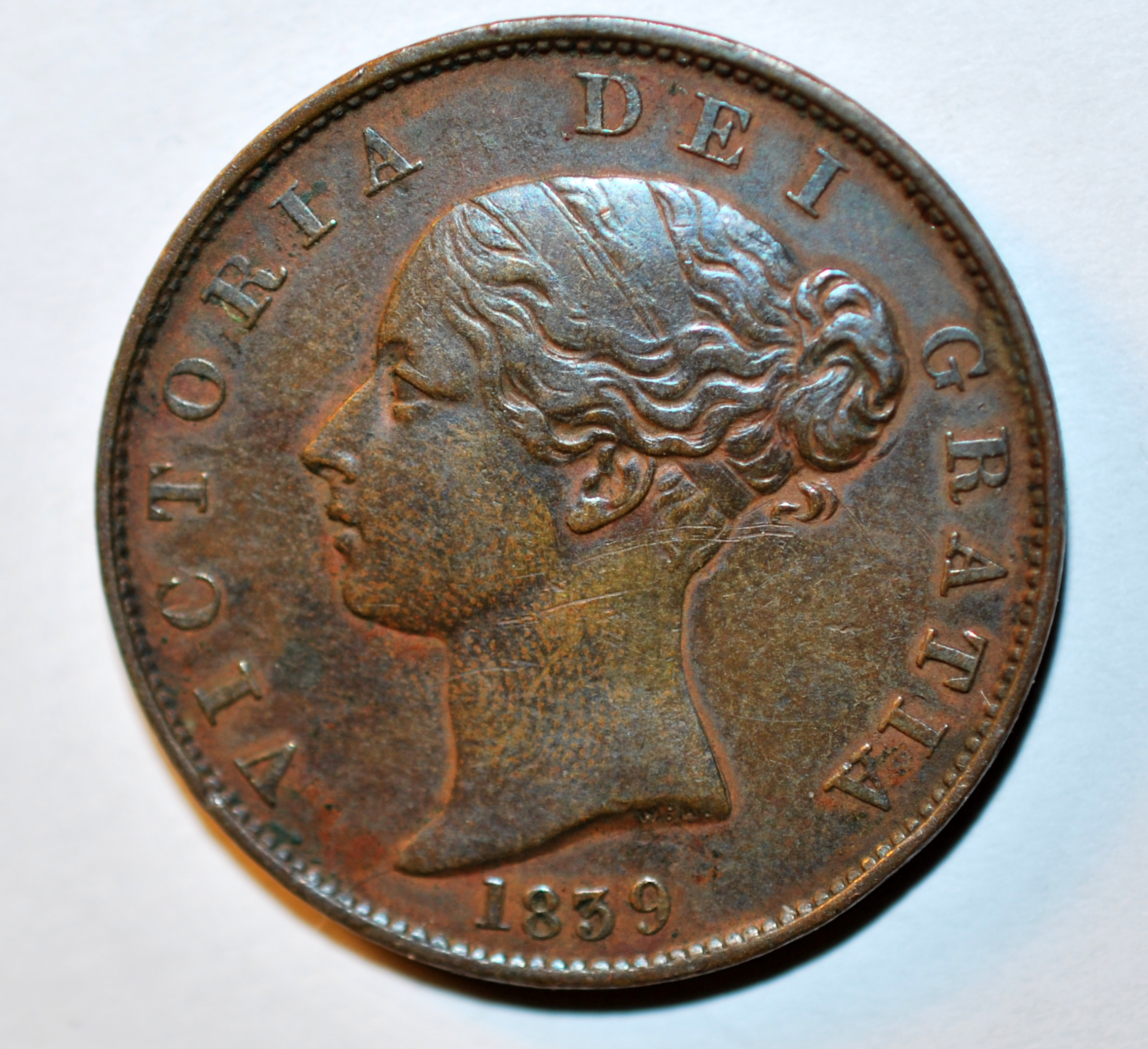

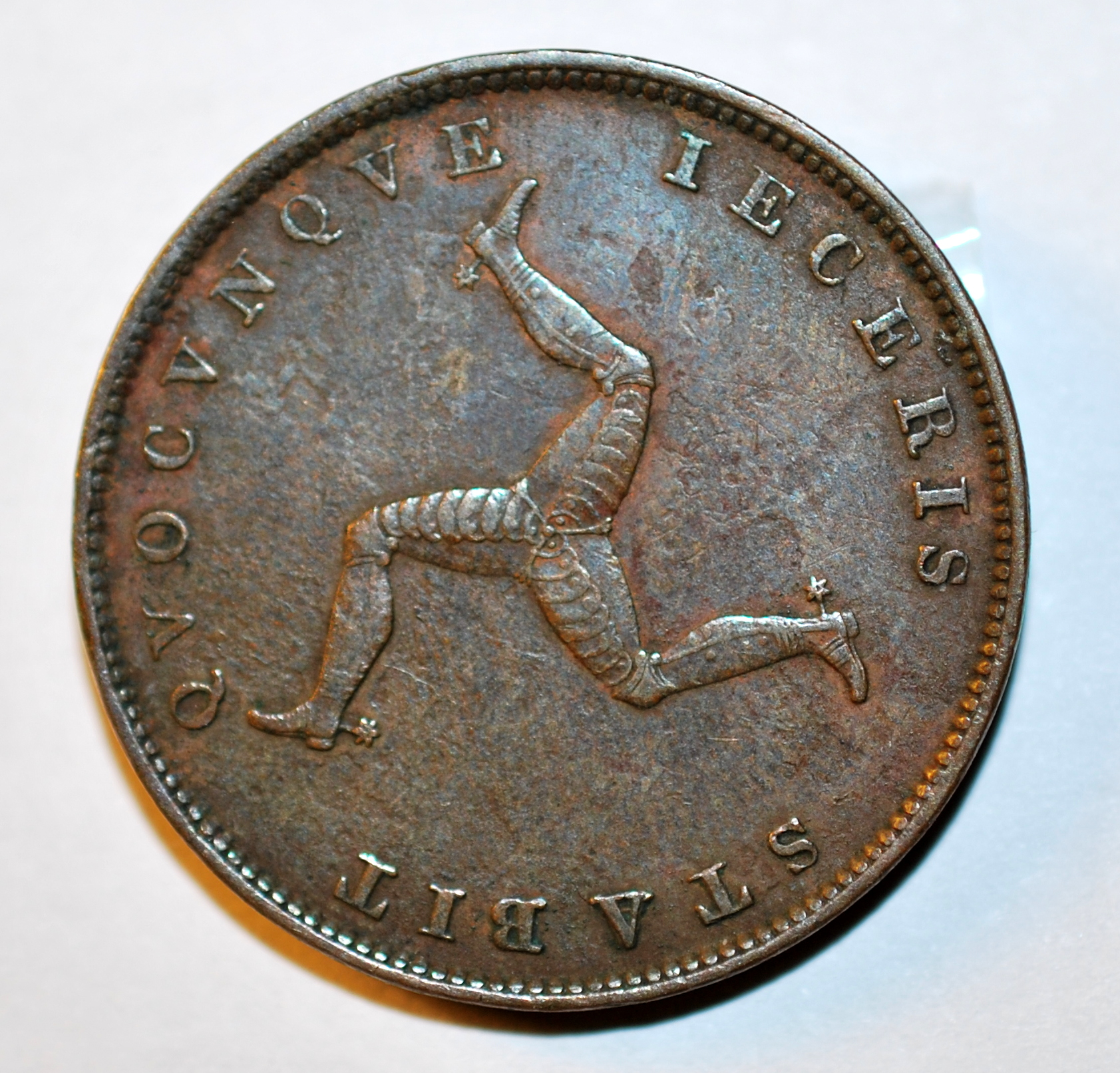

=== Decimal coinage ===
In 1971, 1/2, 1, 2, 5, 10 and 50 new pence coins were introduced. All had the same composition and size as the corresponding British coins. From 1972 onwards, the production of the coinage and commemorative crowns was transferred from the Royal Mint to Pobjoy Mint. The word "new" was removed from the coins in 1976.

In 1978 a 1 pound coin 22 mm (0.87 in) in diameter, 1.45 mm (0.057 in) thick and weighing 4 g (0.14 oz) was introduced, but was not popular compared to the existing £1 note which remained in use. A 20 pence coin was introduced alongside its UK counterpart in 1982. In 1983, when the UK replaced £1 notes with pound coins, the Isle withdrew the pound coins issued since 1978 and began to issue ones to the UK coin's specification (22.5mm and 9.5g (0.89 in and 0.34 oz)). Similarly, a bimetallic £2 coin was introduced alongside the British version in 1998.

The obverse of Manx coins bears the same portrait of Elizabeth II as British coins, with the words ISLE OF MAN to the left. Unlike the former British equivalent, the Manx one pound coin does not bear an edge inscription; instead, the edges are partly milled and partly plain in alternating bands.

Since 2017 a new series of £1 coins produced by Tower Mint were introduced with a continuous finely-milled edge.

Legal tender status of the round £1 coin weighing 9.5 g (0.34 oz) was withdrawn in the UK on 15 October 2017, but unlike the Bailiwicks of Jersey and Guernsey, the Isle of Man did not withdraw legal tender status from its own £1 coins of the same specification. As of 2017 the Isle of Man Treasury had no plans to introduce a 12-sided pound coin. Furthermore, despite no longer being legal tender, old GBP 1 coins remained in use in the Isle of Man until 28 February 2018, after which date only Manx £1 notes and coins, and 12-sided GBP 1 coins will be accepted.

== Banknotes ==
In 1865, the Isle of Man Banking Company was founded and began issuing £1 notes, with £5 notes introduced in 1894. The bank changed its name to the Isle of Man Bank in 1926. Other banks that issued notes (£1 only) on the Isle of Man were:

Bank	Dates
Barclays Bank	1924–1960
Lloyds Bank	1919–1961
Manx Bank	1882–1900
Mercantile Bank of Lancashire	1901–1902
Lancashire & Yorkshire Bank	1904–1927
Martins Bank	1928–1957
Parr’s Bank	1900–1916
London County Westminster and Parr's Bank	1918–1921
Westminster Bank	1923–1961

The Isle of Man Government Notes Act revoked the banks' licences to issue banknotes as of 31 July 1961. The Isle of Man Government started to issue its own notes, in denominations of 10/-, £1 and £5, on 3 July 1961. In 1969, the 10/- note was replaced by a 50 new pence note in the build-up to decimalisation. £20 notes were introduced in 1979. A polymer £1 note was introduced in 1983 but discontinued in 1988. A £50 note was also introduced in 1983. The 50p banknote was withdrawn in 1989. Legal tender status (the IOM's definition of which is akin to the UK) of the 10/-, 50p and £1 polymer notes continued until 31 October 2013, and these notes remained in circulation (albeit rarely seen) until this date, after which they remain exchangeable at branches of the Isle of Man Bank.

The Isle of Man continues to issue a £1 note in addition to the £1 coin (in the UK, the £1 note has now been discontinued, save in Scotland).

The front of all Manx banknotes has a pledge to honour the banknotes (the "promise to pay the bearer on demand") in the name of the Isle of Man Government, and features images of the previous Lord of Mann, Queen Elizabeth II (not wearing a crown), and the triskelion (three legs emblem) and motto. The triskelion symbol is also used as a watermark. Each denomination features a different scene of the Island on its reverse side:

- £1 – Tynwald Hill
- £5 – Castle Rushen
- £10 – Peel Castle
- £20 – the Laxey Wheel
- £50 – Douglas Bay

== Manx pound and the euro ==
It was the Manx Government's position that, if the United Kingdom had decided to participate in the euro, then it would be likely that the Island would also choose to participate. Primarily this was because most of the Island's trade is with the United Kingdom and other countries of Europe, and the break-up of the existing currency union with the UK would cause economic harm to the Island. There was also concern that the island's economy is not large enough to withstand attack by currency speculators if the Manx pound became a stand-alone free-floating currency.

"The idea that the Isle of Man could manage its own currency, for example, with all the difficulties and pitfalls this would involve, is not a viable option."

— Jeremy Peat, Royal Bank of Scotland

Tynwald passed the Currency Act 1992 as part of preparations in the event that the UK decided to adopt the euro. In such a scenario, the Isle of Man wished to retain the right to issue its own currency, believing it to be an important public statement of independence. Retaining the island's own coinage also enables the Isle of Man Treasury to continue to benefit from the accrual of interest on the issued money (seigniorage). The Currency Act allows for the issue of a Manx euro currency at parity with the euro, referred to as a "substitute euro", which has an Isle of Man inscription on the obverse side of the coins. This proposal would essentially have replaced the "substitute sterling" with a "substitute euro", as they would have functioned in the same way. Manx versions of the euro coins and euro banknotes were designed.

While the European Union is not obliged to accept the Manx desire to introduce a special Manx version of the euro, the Isle of Man could arguably introduce a currency pegged to the euro (akin to its situation now vis-à-vis sterling, or the previous relationship between the euro and the Bulgarian lev). There is no precedent for divergent national versions, beyond customising the national side of euro coins in the same way as other eurozone members.

If, after converting to the euro, the exchange rates set by the European Central Bank were to cause economic harm to the Isle of Man, then there would be no eligibility for compulsory funding under Protocol 3 of the Maastricht Treaty, as there would have been for the UK.

In March 1998, the Isle of Man Treasury expressed some concern that if the island adopted the euro along with UK, then the elimination of the risks of currency exchange for the European mainland would increase the attractiveness of the island as a tax haven. This could potentially lead to political pressure from European politicians for the island to legislate against this. On the positive side, the introduction of a Manx euro was expected to benefit Isle of Man manufacturers and tourism by the removal of currency exchange costs for customers and tourists from the eurozone. The latter was also believed to increase the level of competitiveness on the Isle of Man, due to an increase in European businesses, which would benefit the Isle of Man economy.

== See also ==
- Commemorative coins of the Isle of Man
- Alderney pound
- Guernsey pound
- Jersey pound
