= ECV =

ECV may refer to:

== Medicine ==
- Effective circulating volume, a medical term
- External cephalic version, a method of manually turning a late-stage fetus to vertex position from a breech or transverse position
- Extracellular volume

== Vehicles ==
- Electric Convenience Vehicle, another name for a mobility scooter
- Lancia ECV, a rally car

== Other uses ==
- E Clampus Vitus, an organization dedicated to the history of California
- Ecuato Guineana, an airline with the ICAO Code ECV
- El Cajon Valley High School, El Cajon, California, US
- Electoral college votes, in the US Presidential election system
- Electrochemical capacitance-voltage, a form of capacitance–voltage profiling
- Esporte Clube Vitória, a traditional sports club in Brazil
- Essential Climate Variables, a set of systematically observable variables for climate assessment
- Expected Commercial Value, a capital budgeting technique for projects
- Unidad de Valor Constante, a former currency of Ecuador which had the ISO 4217 currency code ECV
