= UVC =

UVC may refer to:

== Science and technology ==
- Ultraviolet C, a subtype of ultraviolet light
- Universal Virtual Computer, a concept in digital archiving
- Umbilical venous catheter or umbilical vein catheter, a type of umbilical line in neonatal medicine
- USB video device class, for connecting video cameras
- Far Ultraviolet Camera/Spectrograph, one of the experiments deployed on the lunar surface by the Apollo 16 astronauts

== Other uses ==
- United Volleyball Club, a volleyball club in the Philippines.
- Uniform Vehicle Code, a set of US traffic laws
- Unidad de Valor Constante, a former currency created by the "Ley de Valores" of Ecuador in 1993
