= ISO 4217 =

Standard defining codes for currencies

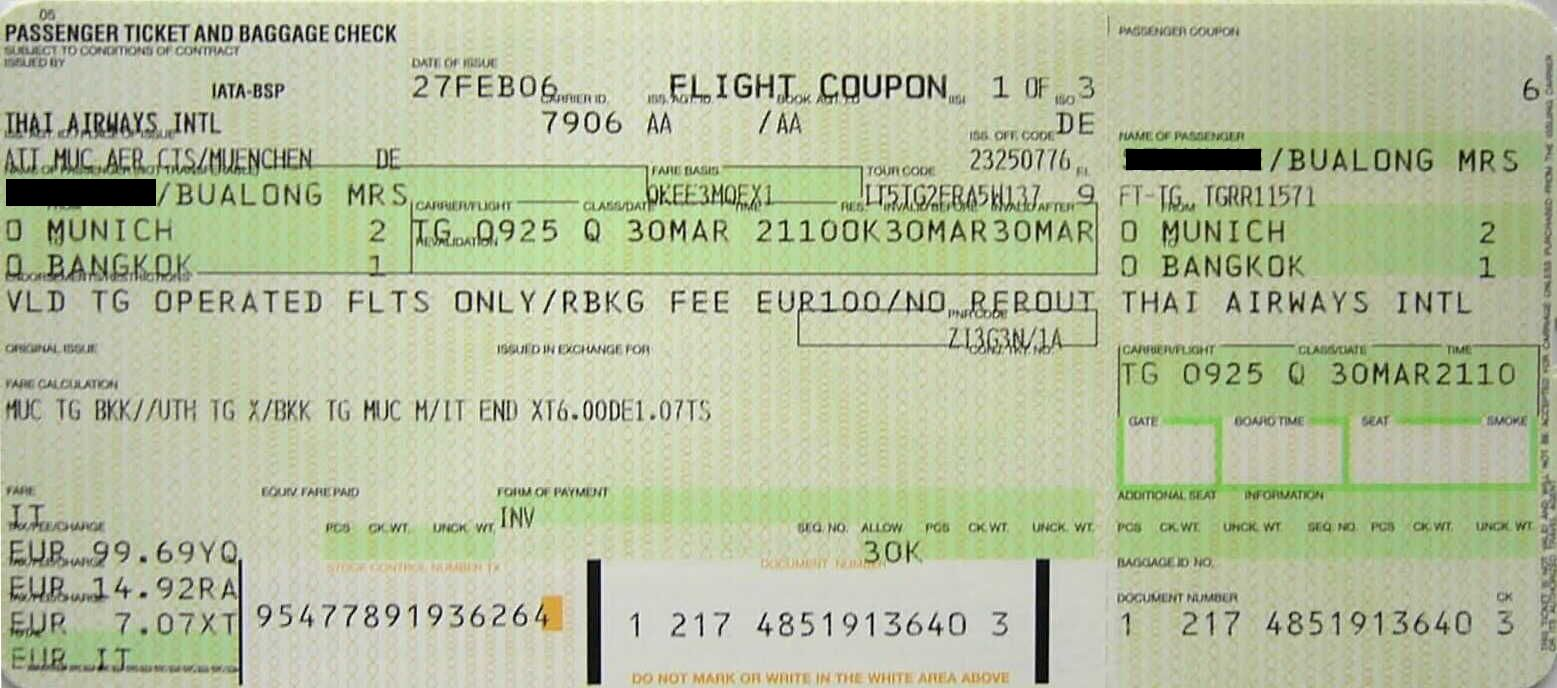
An airline ticket showing the price with ISO 4217 code "EUR" (bottom left) and not with euro currency sign "€"

ISO 4217 is a standard published by the International Organization for Standardization (ISO) that defines alpha codes and numeric codes for the representation of currencies, and provides information about the relationships between currencies and their minor units. This data is published in three tables:

- Table A.1 – Current currency & funds code list
- Table A.2 – Current funds codes
- Table A.3 – List of codes for historic denominations of currencies & funds

The first edition of ISO 4217 was published in 1978. The tables, history and ongoing discussion are maintained by SIX Group on behalf of ISO and the Swiss Association for Standardization (SNV).

The ISO 4217 code list is used in banking and business globally. In many countries, the ISO 4217 alpha codes for the more common currencies are so well known publicly that exchange rates published in newspapers or posted in banks use only these to delineate the currencies, instead of translated currency names or ambiguous currency symbols. ISO 4217 alpha codes are used on airline tickets and international train tickets to remove any ambiguity about the price.

== History ==
In 1973, ISO/TC 68 commenced development of a code for representing currencies, with this resulting standard being encouraged for use in international trade per UNECE Recommendation 9. The Recommendation uses ISO 3166 country codes in its currency table, and notes that these codes correspond to the three-letter ISO 4217 codes where possible.

Due to the volatility of global currencies - such as in the event of redenomination or country formation - the standard is actively maintained and amended by a delegated authority of the SNV, with the most recent edition being ISO 4217:2015.

== Types of codes ==
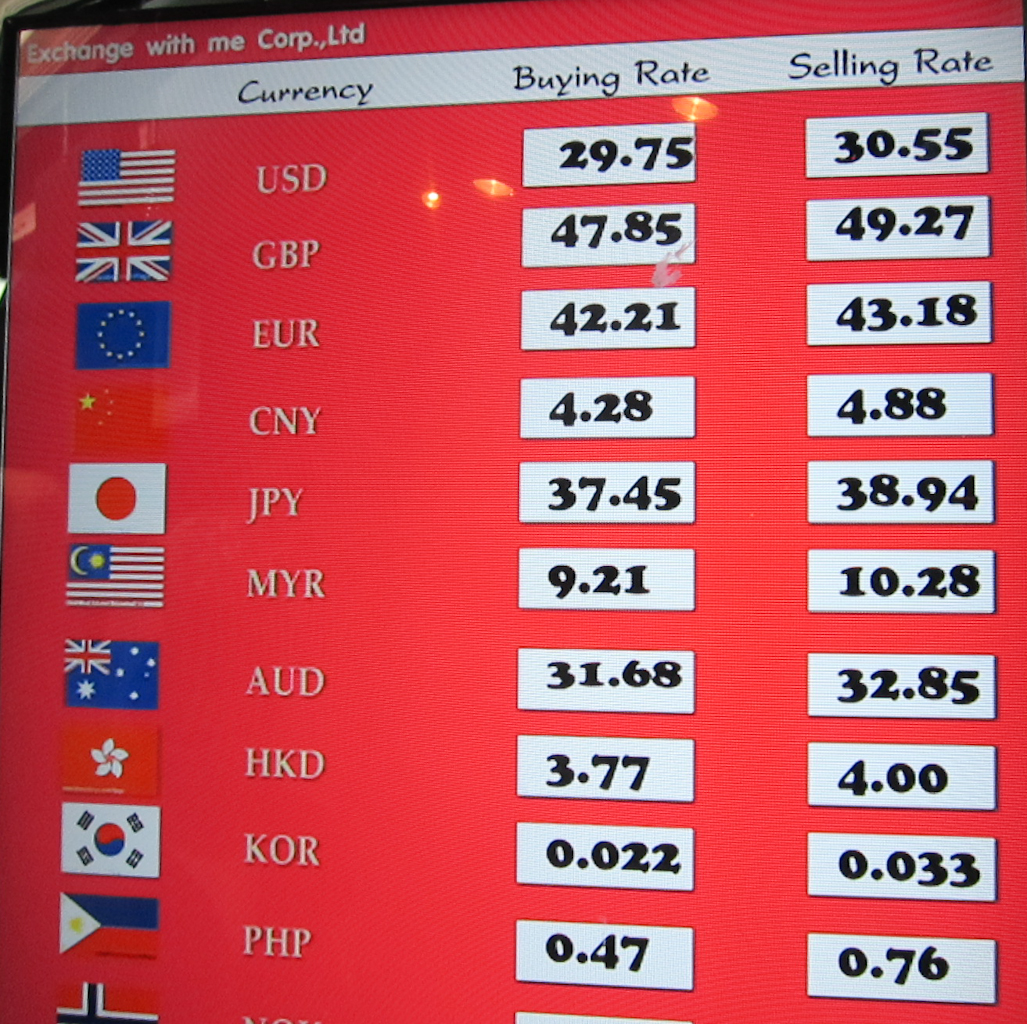
A list of exchange rates for various base currencies given by a money changer in Thailand, with the Thailand Baht as the counter (or quote) currency. Note that the code for the South Korean won is displayed incorrectly; it should be KRW.

=== National currencies ===
In the case of national currencies, the first two letters of the alpha code are the two letters of the ISO 3166-1 alpha-2 country code and the third is usually the initial of the currency's main unit. So Japan's currency code is JPY: "JP" for Japan and "Y" for yen. This eliminates the problem caused by the names dollar, franc, peso, and pound being used in many countries, each having significantly differing values.

In some cases, the third letter of the alpha code is not the initial letter of a currency unit name. There may be a number of reasons for this:

- It is considered important that the code of a completely new currency be highly mnemonic if possible. An example is the assignment of the code EUR to the euro. ISO 4217 amendment 94, which created this code, states "The code element 'EU' has been reserved by the ISO 3166 Maintenance Agency for use within ISO 4217 where 'R' has been appended to make an acceptable mnemonic code." Here the R comes from the third letter in the word "euro".
- The currency in question is replacing another currency of the same (or similar) name, due to revaluation. So that the two currencies have different codes, a different third letter must be chosen for the code of the new currency. In some cases, the third letter is the initial for "new" in that country's language, to distinguish it from an older currency that was revalued; the code sometimes outlasts the usage of the term "new" itself (for example, the code for the Mexican peso is MXN, reflecting its 1993 revaluation). Another solution to a revalued currency having the same name as its predecessor is to choose a third letter which results in a 3-letter code with mnemonic significance. For example, the Russian ruble changed from RUR to RUB following a revaluation, where the B comes from the third letter in the word "ruble".

=== X currencies (funds, precious metals, supranationals, other) ===
In addition to codes for most active national currencies ISO 4217 provides codes for "supranational" currencies, procedural purposes, and several things which are "similar to" currencies:

- Codes for the precious metals gold (XAU), silver (XAG), palladium (XPD), and platinum (XPT) are formed by prefixing the element's chemical symbol with the letter "X". These "currency units" are defined as one troy ounce of the specified metal.
- The code XTS is reserved for use in testing.
- The code XXX is used to denote a "transaction" involving no currency.
- There are also codes specifying certain monetary instruments used in international finance, e.g., XDR is the symbol for special drawing right issued by the International Monetary Fund.
- The codes for most supranational currencies, such as the East Caribbean dollar, the CFP franc, the CFA franc BEAC, and the CFA franc BCEAO. The predecessor to the euro, the European Currency Unit (ECU), had the code XEU.

The use of the initial letter "X" for these purposes is facilitated by the ISO 3166 rule that no official country code beginning with X will ever be assigned.

The inclusion of the EU (denoting the European Union) in the ISO 3166-1 reserved codes list allows the euro to be coded as EUR rather than assigned a code beginning with X, even though it is a supranational currency.

=== Numeric codes ===
ISO 4217 also assigns a three-digit numeric code to each currency. This numeric code is usually the same as the numeric code assigned to the corresponding country by ISO 3166-1. For example, USD (United States dollar) has numeric code 840 which is also the ISO 3166-1 code for the United States.

== List of ISO 4217 currency codes ==
=== Active codes (list one) ===
The following is a list of active codes of official ISO 4217 currency names as of 1 January 2026. In the standard the values are called "alphabetic code", "numeric code", "minor unit", and "entity".

Active ISO 4217 currency codes
Code	Num	D (Note: The number of digits after the decimal separator.)	Currency	Locations listed for this currency (Note: Entities listed in the ISO 4217 standard. See the list of circulating currencies for de facto currency use.)
AED	784	2	United Arab Emirates dirham	United Arab Emirates
AFN	971	2	Afghan afghani	Afghanistan
ALL	008	2	Albanian lek	Albania
AMD	051	2	Armenian dram	Armenia
AOA	973	2	Angolan kwanza	Angola
ARS	032	2	Argentine peso	Argentina
AUD	036	2	Australian dollar	Australia, Christmas Island (CX), Cocos (Keeling) Islands (CC), Heard Island and McDonald Islands (HM), Kiribati (KI), Nauru (NR), Norfolk Island (NF), Tuvalu (TV)
AWG	533	2	Aruban florin	Aruba
AZN	944	2	Azerbaijani manat	Azerbaijan
BAM	977	2	Bosnia and Herzegovina convertible mark	Bosnia and Herzegovina
BBD	052	2	Barbados dollar	Barbados
BDT	050	2	Bangladeshi taka	Bangladesh
BHD	048	3	Bahraini dinar	Bahrain
BIF	108	0	Burundian franc	Burundi
BMD	060	2	Bermudian dollar	Bermuda (pegged to USD 1:1)
BND	096	2	Brunei dollar	Brunei
BOB	068	2	Boliviano	Bolivia
BOV	984	2	Bolivian Mvdol (funds code)	Bolivia
BRL	986	2	Brazilian real	Brazil
BSD	044	2	Bahamian dollar	Bahamas (pegged to USD 1:1)
BTN	064	2	Bhutanese ngultrum	Bhutan
BWP	072	2	Botswana pula	Botswana
BYN	933	2	Belarusian ruble	Belarus
BZD	084	2	Belize dollar	Belize
CAD	124	2	Canadian dollar	Canada
CDF	976	2	Congolese franc	Democratic Republic of the Congo
CHE	947	2	WIR euro (complementary currency)	Switzerland
CHF	756	2	Swiss franc	Switzerland, Liechtenstein (LI)
CHW	948	2	WIR franc (complementary currency)	Switzerland
CLF	990	4	Unidad de Fomento (funds code)	Chile
CLP	152	0	Chilean peso	Chile
CNY	156	2	Renminbi	China
COP	170	2	Colombian peso	Colombia
COU	970	2	Unidad de Valor Real (UVR) (funds code)	Colombia
CRC	188	2	Costa Rican colon	Costa Rica
CUP	192	2	Cuban peso	Cuba
CVE	132	2	Cape Verdean escudo	Cape Verde
CZK	203	2	Czech koruna	Czech Republic
DJF	262	0	Djiboutian franc	Djibouti
DKK	208	2	Danish krone	Denmark, Faroe Islands (FO), Greenland (GL)
DOP	214	2	Dominican peso	Dominican Republic
DZD	012	2	Algerian dinar	Algeria
EGP	818	2	Egyptian pound	Egypt
ERN	232	2	Eritrean nakfa	Eritrea
ETB	230	2	Ethiopian birr	Ethiopia
EUR	978	2	Euro	Eurozone (Note: Consists of Austria (AT), Belgium (BE), Bulgaria (BG), Croatia (HR), Cyprus (CY) (including Akrotiri and Dhekelia), Estonia (EE), Finland (FI) (including Åland Islands (AX)), France (FR) (including French Guiana (GF), French Southern and Antarctic Lands (TF), Guadeloupe (GP), Martinique (MQ), Mayotte (YT), Réunion (RE), Saint Barthélemy (BL), Saint Martin (MF) and Saint Pierre and Miquelon (PM)), Germany (DE), Greece (GR), Ireland (IE), Italy (IT), Latvia (LV), Lithuania (LT), Luxembourg (LU), Malta (MT), Netherlands (NL), Portugal (PT), Slovakia (SK), Slovenia (SI) and Spain (ES)), Andorra (AD) (Note: Not part of the European Union, but uses euro via monetary agreement.), Kosovo (XK) (Note: Adopted unilaterally, not an actual part of the eurozone.), Monaco (MC), Montenegro (ME), San Marino (SM) Vatican City (VA)
FJD	242	2	Fiji dollar	Fiji
FKP	238	2	Falkland Islands pound	Falkland Islands (pegged to GBP 1:1)
GBP	826	2	Pound sterling	United Kingdom, Isle of Man (IM, see Manx pound), Jersey (JE, see Jersey pound), Guernsey (GG, see Guernsey pound), Tristan da Cunha (SH-TA)
GEL	981	2	Georgian lari	Georgia
GHS	936	2	Ghanaian cedi	Ghana
GIP	292	2	Gibraltar pound	Gibraltar (pegged to GBP 1:1)
GMD	270	2	Gambian dalasi	Gambia
GNF	324	0	Guinean franc	Guinea
GTQ	320	2	Guatemalan quetzal	Guatemala
GYD	328	2	Guyanese dollar	Guyana
HKD	344	2	Hong Kong dollar	Hong Kong
HNL	340	2	Honduran lempira	Honduras
HTG	332	2	Haitian gourde	Haiti
HUF	348	2	Hungarian forint	Hungary
IDR	360	2	Indonesian rupiah	Indonesia
ILS	376	2	Israeli new shekel	Israel
INR	356	2	Indian rupee	India, Bhutan (BT)
IQD	368	3	Iraqi dinar	Iraq
IRR	364	2	Iranian rial	Iran
ISK	352	0	Icelandic króna	Iceland
JMD	388	2	Jamaican dollar	Jamaica
JOD	400	3	Jordanian dinar	Jordan
JPY	392	0	Japanese yen	Japan
KES	404	2	Kenyan shilling	Kenya
KGS	417	2	Kyrgyzstani som	Kyrgyzstan
KHR	116	2	Cambodian riel	Cambodia
KMF	174	0	Comoro franc	Comoros
KPW	408	2	North Korean won	North Korea
KRW	410	0 (Note: Jeon is defined as 1/100 won by the Bank of Korea Act, Article 47-2, but it is not practically used and only used for exchange rates.)	South Korean won	South Korea
KWD	414	3	Kuwaiti dinar	Kuwait
KYD	136	2	Cayman Islands dollar	Cayman Islands
KZT	398	2	Kazakhstani tenge	Kazakhstan
LAK	418	2	Lao kip	Laos
LBP	422	2	Lebanese pound	Lebanon
LKR	144	2	Sri Lankan rupee	Sri Lanka
LRD	430	2	Liberian dollar	Liberia
LSL	426	2	Lesotho loti	Lesotho
LYD	434	3	Libyan dinar	Libya
MAD	504	2	Moroccan dirham	Morocco, Western Sahara (EH)
MDL	498	2	Moldovan leu	Moldova
MGA	969	2 (Note: The Malagasy ariary and the Mauritanian ouguiya are technically divided into five subunits (the iraimbilanja and khoum respectively) the coins display "1/5" on their face and are referred to as a "fifth" (Khoum/cinquième); These are not used in practice, but when written out, a single significant digit is used. E.g. 1.2 UM.)	Malagasy ariary	Madagascar
MKD	807	2	Macedonian denar	North Macedonia
MMK	104	2	Myanmar kyat	Myanmar
MNT	496	2	Mongolian tögrög	Mongolia
MOP	446	2	Macanese pataca	Macau
MRU	929	2	Mauritanian ouguiya	Mauritania
MUR	480	2	Mauritian rupee	Mauritius
MVR	462	2	Maldivian rufiyaa	Maldives
MWK	454	2	Malawian kwacha	Malawi
MXN	484	2	Mexican peso	Mexico
MXV	979	2	Mexican Unidad de Inversion (UDI) (funds code)	Mexico
MYR	458	2	Malaysian ringgit	Malaysia
MZN	943	2	Mozambican metical	Mozambique
NAD	516	2	Namibian dollar	Namibia (pegged to ZAR 1:1)
NGN	566	2	Nigerian naira	Nigeria
NIO	558	2	Nicaraguan córdoba	Nicaragua
NOK	578	2	Norwegian krone	Norway, Svalbard and Jan Mayen (SJ), Bouvet Island (BV)
NPR	524	2	Nepalese rupee	Nepal
NZD	554	2	New Zealand dollar	New Zealand, Cook Islands (CK), Niue (NU), Pitcairn Islands (PN; see also Pitcairn Islands dollar), Tokelau (TK)
OMR	512	3	Omani rial	Oman
PAB	590	2	Panamanian balboa	Panama (pegged to USD 1:1)
PEN	604	2	Peruvian sol	Peru
PGK	598	2	Papua New Guinean kina	Papua New Guinea
PHP	608	2	Philippine peso	Philippines
PKR	586	2	Pakistani rupee	Pakistan
PLN	985	2	Polish złoty	Poland
PYG	600	0	Paraguayan guaraní	Paraguay
QAR	634	2	Qatari riyal	Qatar
RON	946	2	Romanian leu	Romania
RSD	941	2	Serbian dinar	Serbia
RUB	643	2	Russian ruble	Russia
RWF	646	0	Rwandan franc	Rwanda
SAR	682	2	Saudi riyal	Saudi Arabia
SBD	090	2	Solomon Islands dollar	Solomon Islands
SCR	690	2	Seychelles rupee	Seychelles
SDG	938	2	Sudanese pound	Sudan
SEK	752	2	Swedish krona	Sweden
SGD	702	2	Singapore dollar	Singapore
SHP	654	2	Saint Helena pound	Saint Helena (SH-HL), Ascension Island (SH-AC)
SLE	925	2	Sierra Leonean leone (new leone)	Sierra Leone
SOS	706	2	Somali shilling	Somalia
SRD	968	2	Surinamese dollar	Suriname
SSP	728	2	South Sudanese pound	South Sudan
STN	930	2	São Tomé and Príncipe dobra	São Tomé and Príncipe
SVC	222	2	Salvadoran colón	El Salvador
SYP	760	2	Syrian pound	Syria
SZL	748	2	Swazi lilangeni	Eswatini
THB	764	2	Thai baht	Thailand
TJS	972	2	Tajikistani somoni	Tajikistan
TMT	934	2	Turkmenistan manat	Turkmenistan
TND	788	3	Tunisian dinar	Tunisia
TOP	776	2	Tongan paʻanga	Tonga
TRY	949	2	Turkish lira	Turkey
TTD	780	2	Trinidad and Tobago dollar	Trinidad and Tobago
TWD	901	2	New Taiwan dollar	Taiwan
TZS	834	2	Tanzanian shilling	Tanzania
UAH	980	2	Ukrainian hryvnia	Ukraine
UGX	800	0	Ugandan shilling	Uganda
USD	840	2	United States dollar	United States, American Samoa (AS), British Indian Ocean Territory (IO) (also uses GBP), British Virgin Islands (VG), Bonaire, Sint Eustatius and Saba (BQ - Caribbean Netherlands), Ecuador (EC), El Salvador (SV), Guam (GU), Marshall Islands (MH), Federated States of Micronesia (FM), Northern Mariana Islands (MP), Palau (PW), Panama (PA) (as well as Panamanian Balboa), Puerto Rico (PR), Timor-Leste (TL), Turks and Caicos Islands (TC), U.S. Virgin Islands (VI), United States Minor Outlying Islands (UM)
USN	997	2	United States dollar (next day) (funds code)	United States
UYI	940	0	Uruguay Peso en Unidades Indexadas (URUIURUI) (funds code)	Uruguay
UYU	858	2	Uruguayan peso	Uruguay
UYW	927	4	Unidad previsional	Uruguay
UZS	860	2	Uzbekistani sum	Uzbekistan
VED	926	2	Venezuelan digital bolívar	Venezuela
VES	928	2	Venezuelan sovereign bolívar	Venezuela
VND	704	0	Vietnamese đồng	Vietnam
VUV	548	0	Vanuatu vatu	Vanuatu
WST	882	2	Samoan tala	Samoa
XAD	396	2	Arab Accounting Dinar	Arab Monetary Fund
XAF	950	0	CFA franc BEAC	Cameroon (CM), Central African Republic (CF), Republic of the Congo (CG), Chad (TD), Equatorial Guinea (GQ), Gabon (GA)
XAG	961	.	Silver (one troy ounce)	
XAU	959	.	Gold (one troy ounce)	
XBA	955	.	European Composite Unit (EURCO) (bond market unit)	
XBB	956	.	European Monetary Unit (E.M.U.-6) (bond market unit)	
XBC	957	.	European Unit of Account 9 (E.U.A.-9) (bond market unit)	
XBD	958	.	European Unit of Account 17 (E.U.A.-17) (bond market unit)	
XCD	951	2	East Caribbean dollar	Anguilla (AI), Antigua and Barbuda (AG), Dominica (DM), Grenada (GD), Montserrat (MS), Saint Kitts and Nevis (KN), Saint Lucia (LC), Saint Vincent and the Grenadines (VC)
XCG	532	2	Caribbean guilder	Curaçao (CW), Sint Maarten (SX)
XDR	960	.	Special drawing rights	International Monetary Fund
XOF	952	0	CFA franc BCEAO	Benin (BJ), Burkina Faso (BF), Ivory Coast (CI), Guinea-Bissau (GW), Mali (ML), Niger (NE), Senegal (SN), Togo (TG)
XPD	964	.	Palladium (one troy ounce)	
XPF	953	0	CFP franc (franc Pacifique)	French territories of the Pacific Ocean: French Polynesia (PF), New Caledonia (NC), Wallis and Futuna (WF)
XPT	962	.	Platinum (one troy ounce)	
XSU	994	.	SUCRE	Unified System for Regional Compensation (SUCRE)
XTS	963	.	Code reserved for testing	
XUA	965	.	ADB Unit of Account	African Development Bank
XXX	999	.	No currency	
YER	886	2	Yemeni rial	Yemen
ZAR	710	2	South African rand	South Africa, Eswatini (SZ), Lesotho (LS), Namibia (NA)
ZMW	967	2	Zambian kwacha	Zambia
ZWG	924	2	Zimbabwe Gold	Zimbabwe

According to UN/CEFACT recommendation 9, paragraphs 8–9 ECE/TRADE/203, 1996:

8. In applications where monetary resources associated with a currency (i.e. funds) need not be specified and where a field identifier indicating currency is used, the first two (leftmost) characters are sufficient to identify a currency—example: US for United States dollars for general, unspecified purposes where a field identifier indicating currency is present. (A field identifier can be a preprinted field heading in an aligned document or a similarly-agreed application in electronic transmission of data.)
9. In applications where there is a need to distinguish between types of currencies, or where funds are required as in the banking environment, or where there is no field identifier, the third (rightmost) character of the alphabetic code is an indicator, preferably mnemonic, derived from the name of the major currency unit or fund—example: USD for general, unspecified purposes; USN for United States dollar next-day funds, and USS for funds which are immediately available for Federal Reserve transfer, withdrawal in cash or transfer in like funds (same-day funds). Since there is no need for such a distinction in international trade applications, the funds codes have not been included in the Annex to the present Recommendation.

=== Historical codes ===
A number of currencies had official ISO 4217 currency codes and currency names until their replacement by another currency. The table below shows the ISO currency codes of former currencies and their common names (which do not always match the ISO 4217 names). That table has been introduced end 1988 by ISO.

Historical ISO 4217 currency codes
Code	Num	D	Currency	From	Until	Replaced by
ADP	020	0	Andorran peseta	1869	1999-01-01	EUR
AFA	004	2	Afghan afghani	1925	2003	AFN
ALK	008	.	Old Albanian lek	1946	1965	
ANG	532	2	Netherlands Antillean guilder		2025-03-31	XCG
AOK	024	0	Angolan kwanza	1977-01-08	1990-09-24	AON (AOA)
AON	024	0	Angolan novo kwanza	1990-09-25	1995-06-30	AOR (AOA)
AOR	982	0	Angolan kwanza reajustado	1995-07-01	1999-11-30	AOA
ARA	032	2	Argentine austral	1985-06-15	1991-12-31	ARS
ARP	032	2	Argentine peso argentino	1983-06-06	1985-06-14	ARA (ARS)
ARY	032	.	Argentine peso ley	January 1970	1983-06-06	ARP (ARS)
ATS	040	2	Austrian schilling	1945	1999-01-01	EUR
AYM (Note: Added on 2005-06-01 with an effective date of 2006-01-01, but moved to the historic index and replaced by AZN on 2005-10-13 due to not complying with the currency coding standardization rules.)	945	0	Azerbaijani manat			
AZM	031	2	Azerbaijani manat	1992-08-15	2006-01-01	AZN
BAD	070	2	Bosnia and Herzegovina dinar	1992-07-01	1998-02-04	BAM
BEC	993	.	Belgian convertible franc (funds code)		1990-05-01	
BEF	056	2	Belgian franc	1832	1999-01-01	EUR
BEL	992	.	Belgian financial franc (funds code)			
BGJ	100	.	Bulgarian lev (first)	1881	1952	BGK
BGK	100	.	Bulgarian lev (second)	1952	1962	BGL
BGL	100	2	Bulgarian lev (third)	1962	1999-08-31	BGN
BGN	975	2	Bulgarian lev (fourth)	1999-08-31	2025-12-31	EUR
BOP	068	2	Bolivian peso	1963-01-01	1987-01-01	BOB
BRB	076	2	Brazilian cruzeiro	1967	1986-02-28	BRC (BRL)
BRC	076	2	Brazilian cruzado	1986-02-28	1989-01-15	BRN (BRL)
BRE	076	2	Brazilian cruzeiro	1990-03-15	1993-08-01	BRR (BRL)
BRN	076	2	Brazilian cruzado novo	1989-01-16	1990-03-15	BRE (BRL)
BRR	987	2	Brazilian cruzeiro real	1993-08-01	1994-06-30	BRL
BUK	104	.	Burmese kyat			MMK
BYB	112	2	Belarusian ruble	1992	1999-12-31	BYR (BYN)
BYR	974	0	Belarusian ruble	2000-01-01	2016-06-30	BYN
CHC	948	2	WIR franc (for electronic currency)		2004-12	CHW
CSD	891	2	Serbian dinar	2003-07-03	2006-10-25	RSD
CSJ	203	2	Czechoslovak koruna (second)		1953	CSK
CSK	200	2	Czechoslovak koruna	1953	1993-02-08	CZK/SKK (CZK/EUR)
CUC	931	2	Cuban convertible peso	2009-03-01	2021-06-30	CUP
CYP	196	2	Cypriot pound	1879	2006-01-01	EUR
DDM	278		East German mark	1948-06-21	1990-07-01	DEM (EUR)
DEM	276 (Note: The numeric code for the German Mark was originally 280: it was changed to 276 on 16 April 1999 to align with ISO 3166-1.)	2	German mark	1948	1999-01-01	EUR
ECS	218	0	Ecuadorian sucre	1884	2000-02-29	USD
ECV	983	2	Ecuador Unidad de Valor Constante (funds code)	1993	2000-02-29	—
EEK	233	2	Estonian kroon	1992	2011-01-01	EUR
ESA	996		Spanish peseta (account A)	1978	1981	ESP (EUR)
ESB	995		Spanish peseta (account B)	?	1994-12	ESP (EUR)
ESP	724	0	Spanish peseta	1869	1999-01-01	EUR
FIM	246	2	Finnish markka	1860	1999-01-01	EUR
FRF	250	2	French franc	1960	1999-01-01	EUR
GEK	268	0	Georgian kuponi	1993-04-05	1995-10-02	GEL
GHC	288	2	Ghanaian cedi	1967	2007-07-01	GHS
GHP	939	2	Ghanaian cedi		2007-06-18	GHS
GNE	324		Guinean syli	1971	1985-12-31	GNF
GNS	324	.	Guinean syli	1971	1985	GNF
GQE	226		Equatorial Guinean ekwele	1975	1985-12-31	XAF
GRD	300	0, 2	Greek drachma	1954-05-01	2001-01-01	EUR
GWE	624	.	Guinean escudo			GWP
GWP	624	2	Guinea-Bissau peso	1975	1997-05-31	XOF
HRD	191	2	Croatian dinar	1991-12-23	1994-05-30	HRK
HRK	191	2	Croatian kuna	1994-05-30	2023-01-01	EUR
IEP	372	2	Irish pound	1938	1999-01-01	EUR
ILP	376	3, 2	Israeli pound	1948	1980-02-20	ILR (ILS)
ILR	376	2	Israeli shekel	1980-02-24	1985-12-31	ILS
ISJ	352	2	Icelandic króna	1922	1981-06-30	ISK
ITL	380	0	Italian lira	1861	1999-01-01	EUR
LAJ	418		Lao kip	1965	1979-12-31	LAK
LSM	426	.	Lesotho loti			
LTL	440	2	Lithuanian litas	1993	2015-01-01	EUR
LTT	440	2	Lithuanian talonas			LTL
LUC	989	.	Luxembourg convertible franc (funds code)			
LUF	442	2	Luxembourg franc	1944	1999-01-01	EUR
LUL	988	.	Luxembourg financial franc (funds code)			
LVL	428	2	Latvian lats	1993-03-05	2014-01-01	EUR
LVR	428	2	Latvian rublis	1992-05-04	1993-03-05	LVL
MGF	450	0	Malagasy franc	1963-07-01	2005-01-01	MGA
MLF	466		Malian franc	1962	1984-01-01	XOF
MRO	478	2	Mauritanian ouguiya	1973-06-29	2018-01-01	MRU
MTL	470	2	Maltese lira	1972-05-26	2006-01-01	EUR
MTP	470	.	Maltese pound			MTL
MVQ	462		Maldivian rupee	?	1981-12-31	MVR
MXP	484		Mexican peso	?	1993-03-31	MXN
MZE	508	2	Mozambican escudo	1914	1980	MZN
MZM	508	2	Mozambican metical	1980	2006-06-30	MZN
NIC	558	2	Nicaraguan córdoba	1988	1990-10-31	NIO
NLG	528	2	Dutch guilder	1810s	1999-01-01	EUR
PEH	604		Peruvian old sol	1863	1985-02-01	PEI (PEN)
PEI	604		Peruvian inti	1985-02-01	1991-10-01	PEN
PES	604	2	Peruvian sol	1863	1985	PEI
PLZ	616	2	Polish zloty	1950-10-30	1994-12-31	PLN
PTE	620	0	Portuguese escudo	1911-05-22	1999-01-01	EUR
RHD	716	2	Rhodesian dollar	1970	1980	ZWC
ROK	642	.	Romanian leu (second)	1947	1952	ROL
ROL	642	0	Romanian leu (third)	1952-01-28	2005	RON
RUR	810	2	Russian ruble	1992	1997-12-31	RUB
SDD	736	2	Sudanese dinar	1992-06-08	2007-01-10	SDG
SDP	736		Sudanese old pound	1956	1992-06-08	SDD (SDG)
SIT	705	2	Slovenian tolar	1991-10-08	2007-01-01	EUR
SKK	703	2	Slovak koruna	1993-02-08	2009-01-01	EUR
SLL	694	2	Sierra Leonean leone (old leone)			
SRG	740	2	Surinamese guilder	1942	2004	SRD
STD	678	2	São Tomé and Príncipe dobra	1977	2018-04-01	STN
SUR	810		Soviet Union ruble	1961	1991-12-26	RUR (RUB/AMD/AZN/BYN/EUR/GEL/KZT/KGS/MDL/TJS/TMT/UAK/UZS)
TJR	762	0	Tajikistani ruble	1995-05-10	2000-10-30	TJS
TMM	795	2	Turkmenistani manat	1993-11-1	2008-12-31	TMT
TPE	626	0	Portuguese Timorese escudo	1959	1976	USD
TRL	792	0	Turkish lira	1923	2005-12-31	TRY
UAK	804	2	Ukrainian karbovanets	1992-10-1	1996-09-01	UAH
UGS	800		Ugandan shilling	1966	1987-12-31	UGX
UGW	800		Old Shilling (Uganda)	1989	1990	
USS	998	2	United States dollar (same day) (funds code)	?	2014-03-28	—
UYN	858	2	Uruguay peso	1896	1975-07-01	UYP
UYP	858		Uruguay new peso	1975-07-01	1993-03-01	UYU
VEB	862	2	Venezuelan bolívar	1879-03-31	2008-01-01	VEF (VES)
VEF	937	2	Venezuelan bolívar fuerte	2008-01-01	2018-08-20	VES
VNC	704	.	Old Vietnamese dong			
XEU	954	0	European Currency Unit	1979-03-13	1998-12-31	EUR
XFO	...		Gold franc (special settlement currency)	1803	2003	XDR
XFU	...	.	UIC franc (special settlement currency)	?	2013-11-07	EUR
XRE	...	.	RINET funds code			
YDD	720		South Yemeni dinar	1965	1996-06-11	YER
YUD	890	2	Yugoslav dinar	1966-01-01	1989-12-31	YUN
YUM	891	2	FR Yugoslav dinar	1994-01-24	2003-07-02	CSD (RSD/EUR)
YUN	890	2	Yugoslav dinar	1990-01-01	1992-06-30	SIT/HRD/MKD/YUR/BAD)
ZAL	991	2	South African financial rand (funds code)	1985-09-01	1995-03-13	—
ZMK	894	2	Zambian kwacha	1968-01-16	2013-01-01	ZMW
ZRN	180	2	Zairean new zaire	1993	1997	CDF
ZRZ	180	2	Zairean zaire	1967	1993	ZRN (CDF)
ZWC	716	2	Rhodesian dollar	1970-02-17	1980	ZWD (USD/ZWG)
ZWD	716	2	Zimbabwean dollar (first)	1980-04-18	2006-07-31	ZWN (USD/ZWG)
ZWL	932	2	Zimbabwean dollar (fourth & fifth) (Note: The fifth Zimbabwean dollar, formerly the RTGS dollar until 24 June 2019, reuses ZWL: the fourth Zimbabwean dollar also used the code, from 2 February 2009 to 30 September 2015.)	2009-02-02	2024-09-01	ZWG
ZWN	942	2	Zimbabwean dollar (second)	2006-08-01	2008-07-31	ZWR (USD/ZWG)
ZWR	935	2	Zimbabwean dollar (third)	2008-08-01	2009-02-02	ZWL (USD/ZWG)

== Currency details ==
=== Minor unit fractions ===
The 2008 (7th) edition of ISO 4217 says the following about minor units of currency:

Requirements sometimes arise for values to be expressed in terms of minor units of currency. When this occurs, it is necessary to know the decimal relationship that exists between the currency concerned and its minor unit. This information has therefore been included in this International Standard and is shown in the column headed "Minor unit" in Tables A.1 and A.2; "0" means that there is no minor unit for that currency, whereas "1", "2" and "3" signify a ratio of 10:1, 100:1 and 1000:1 respectively. The names of the minor units are not given.

Examples for the ratios of 100:1 and 1000:1 include the United States dollar and the Bahraini dinar, for which the column headed "Minor unit" shows "2" and "3", respectively. As of 2021, two currencies have non-decimal ratios, the Mauritanian ouguiya and the Malagasy ariary; in both cases the ratio is 5:1. For these, the "Minor unit" column shows the number "2". Some currencies, such as the Burundian franc, do not in practice have any minor currency unit at all. These show the number "0", as with currencies whose minor units are unused due to negligible value.

=== Code position in amount formatting ===
The ISO 4217 standard does not regulate either the spacing, prefixing or suffixing in usage of currency codes. The style guide of the European Union's Publication Office declares that, for texts issued by or through the Commission in English, Irish, Latvian, and Maltese, the ISO 4217 code is to be followed by a "hard space" (non-breaking space) and the amount:

a sum of EUR 30

and for texts in Bulgarian, Croatian, Czech, Danish, Dutch, Estonian, Finnish, French, German, Greek, Hungarian, Italian, Lithuanian, Polish, Portuguese, Romanian, Slovak, Slovene, Spanish, and Swedish the order is reversed; the amount is followed by a non-breaking space and the ISO 4217 code:

une somme de 30 EUR

As illustrated, the order is determined not by the currency but by the native language of the document context.

=== USD, USN: two US currency codes ===
The US dollar has two codes assigned: USD and USN ("US dollar next day"). The USS (same day) code is not in use any longer, and was removed from the list of active ISO 4217 codes in March 2014.

== Non ISO 4217 currencies ==
=== Currencies without ISO 4217 currency codes ===
A number of active currencies do not have an ISO 4217 code, because they may be:

1. a minor currency pegged at par (1:1) to a larger currency, even if independently regulated,
2. a currency only used for commemorative banknotes or coins, or
3. a currency of an unrecognized or partially recognized state.

These currencies include:

- Abkhazian apsar (state of issue is viewed as de jure part of Georgia)
- Alderney pound (1:1 pegged to sterling)
- Cook Islands dollar (1:1 pegged to the New Zealand dollar)
- Faroese króna (1:1 pegged to the Danish krone)
- Guernsey pound (1:1 pegged to sterling)
- Isle of Man pound (1:1 pegged to sterling)
- Jersey pound (1:1 pegged to sterling)
- Kiribati dollar (1:1 pegged to the Australian dollar)
- Maltese scudo (1:0.24 pegged to the euro) (Currency of the Sovereign Order of Malta; the Republic of Malta uses the euro.)
- Sahrawi peseta (pegged to the euro), sometimes given the code "EHP" but this has not been assigned by the ISO
- Somaliland shilling (state of issue is viewed as de jure part of Somalia, exchange rate not fixed)
- South Ossetian zarin (state of issue is viewed as de jure part of Georgia)
- Transnistrian ruble (state of issue is viewed as de jure part of Moldova)
- Tuvaluan dollar (1:1 pegged to the Australian dollar)

See Category:Fixed exchange rate for a list of all currently pegged currencies.

=== Non-standard codes ===
Despite having no presence or status in the standard, three letter acronyms that resemble ISO 4217 coding are sometimes used locally or commercially to represent de facto currencies or currency instruments.

Active abbreviations resembling ISO 4217 currency codes
Unofficial code	ISO 4217 code	D	Currency	Locations using this currency	Notes
BDS (Note: The Government of Barbados and the Central Bank often use the International vehicle registration code "BDS" instead of the ISO 4217 code "BBD". For example, the Central Bank uses the code "BDS$" for listing past exchange rates on its website.)	BBD	2	Barbados dollar	Barbados	The Government of Barbados and Central Bank of Barbados sometimes use the abbreviation "BDS" rather than the official ISO 4217 "BBD". BDS conflicts with ISO 4217, because BD is reserved for Bangladesh.
CNH	—N/a	2	Renminbi (offshore)	Hong Kong	The code CNH is used to represent the Renminbi in offshore trading, especially offshore trading involving Hong Kong. See Offshore Renminbi (CNH). The USD/CNY rate and the USD/CNH rate are, usually, different.
CNT	—N/a	2	Renminbi (offshore)	Taiwan	The code CNT is used to represent the Renminbi in offshore trading, especially offshore trading involving Taiwan. See Other markets.
GGP	—N/a	2	Guernsey pound	Guernsey	
IMP	—N/a	2	Manx pound	Isle of Man	
JEP	—N/a	2	Jersey pound	Jersey	
KID	—N/a	2	Kiribati dollar	Kiribati	
NIS	ILS	2	Israeli shekel	Israel	NIS stands for New Israeli Shekel, the currency that replaced the first Israeli shekel due to hyperinflation. NIS conflicts with ISO 4217, because NI stands for Nicaragua.
NTD	TWD	2	New Taiwan dollar	Taiwan	NTD stands for New Taiwan Dollar, the official name of the Taiwanese currency
PRB	—N/a	2	Transnistrian ruble	Transnistria	Transnistria is an unrecognised state and is de facto rather than de jure independent. PRB conflicts with ISO 4217, because PR stands for Puerto Rico.
SLS	—N/a	2	Somaliland shilling	Somaliland	Somaliland is an unrecognised state and is de facto rather than de jure independent. SLS conflicts with ISO 4217, because SL stands for Sierra Leone.
STG	GBP	2	Sterling	United Kingdom	STG stands for STerlinG, the official name of the United Kingdom's currency, of which the pound is the main unit. While not an ISO code, "STG" is nonetheless the CHAPS real-time gross settlement and clearing code for sterling recognized by SWIFT. It is listed in ISO 20022 as a registered external code used by SWIFT. STG conflicts with ISO 4217, because ST stands for São Tomé and Príncipe.
RMB	CNY	2	Renminbi	Mainland China	RMB stands for RenMinBi, the official name of the Chinese currency, of which the yuan is the main unit. RMB conflicts with ISO 4217 because RM is reserved for Madagascar.
TVD	—N/a	2	Tuvalu dollar	Tuvalu	TV is the ISO 3166 two-letter code for Tuvalu

The following non-ISO codes were used in the past.

Historical non-ISO 4217 currency codes
Unofficial code	ISO 4217 code	D	Currency	Locations that used this currency	Notes
ADF	—N/a	2	Andorran franc	Andorra	De facto currency used until January 1999, when it was replaced by the euro (EUR).
ARL	ARY	2	Argentine peso ley	Argentina	Used from January 1970 to May 1983, when it was replaced by the Argentine peso argentino (ARP).
MAF (Note: Not compatible with ISO 4217, as currency codes beginning with MA are reserved to Morocco. However, formerly referred to in the list of historical currencies with a footnote stating that it is a "non ISO code". Amended to MLF on 2007-06-18.)	—N/a	2	Malian franc	Mali	Used from 1962 to 1984. The code MAF was formerly noted in ISO 4217, but was amended to MLF on 2007-06-18.
MCF	—N/a	2	Monégasque franc	Monaco	Used until January 1999, when it was replaced by the euro (EUR).
MKN	—N/a		first denar	North Macedonia	Used from April 1992 through 1993, when it was replaced by the second denar (MKD).
SML	—N/a	0	San Marinese lira	San Marino	Used until January 1999, when it was replaced by the euro (EUR).
VAL	—N/a	0	Vatican lira	Vatican City	Used until January 1999, when it was replaced by the euro (EUR).
YUG	—N/a	2	Yugoslav dinar	FR Yugoslavia	Re-denomination used in January 1994 until it was replaced by the novi dinar (YUM).
YUO	—N/a	2	Yugoslav dinar	FR Yugoslavia	Re-denomination used from October–December 1993, when it was again re-denominated (YUG).
YUR	—N/a	2	Reformed Yugoslav dinar	FR Yugoslavia (Note: Croatia and Macedonia issued their own currencies before the 1992 dinar entered circulation. Bosnia and Herzegovina issued their own currency when the 1992 dinar entered circulation.)	Revaluation used from July 1992 to September 1993 until re-denomination (YUO).
ZWB		2	Zimbabwean bonds	Zimbabwe	A near money legal tender

=== Unofficial codes for minor units of currency ===
Minor units of currency (also known as currency subdivisions or currency subunits) are often used for pricing and trading company shares and other assets, such as energy, but are not assigned codes by ISO 4217. Two conventions for representing minor units are in widespread use:

- Replacing the third letter of the ISO 4217 Code of the parent currency with an upper-case "X". Examples are GBX for the Penny Sterling, USX for the US Cent, and EUX for the Euro Cent.
- Replacing the third letter of the ISO 4217 Code of the parent currency with the first letter of the name of a minor unit, using lower-case. Examples are GBp for Penny Sterling, USc for the US Cent, and EUc for the Euro Cent.

A third convention is similar to the second one but uses an upper-case letter, e.g. ZAC for the South African Cent.

=== Cryptocurrencies ===
Cryptocurrencies have not been assigned an ISO 4217 code. However, some cryptocurrencies and cryptocurrency exchanges use a three-letter acronym that resemble an ISO 4217 code.

== See also ==
- ISO 9362 – SWIFT business identifier coding standard
  - SWIFT – Financial telecommunication network
- Currency symbol – Symbol used to represent a monetary currency's name
- List of circulating currencies
- List of international trade topics
