= Commemorative coins of the Isle of Man =

In 1972, the government of the Isle of Man, signed a long-term contract with the Pobjoy Mint of Tadworth, Surrey, England, to mint coins for the state. They have produced commemorative coinage.

== Half-penny ==
- 1981: A 'Food for All' coin for the FAO.

== Fifty pence ==
- 1979: Day of Tynwald.

== See also ==
- Coins of the Manx pound
