= Guernsey pound =

Currency of Guernsey

Livre de Guernesey (French) GGP

ISO 4217
- Code: none (GBP unofficially)

Units of account
- Plural
- Symbol: £
- Subunit
- 1/100: penny
- Plural
- penny: pence
- Symbol
- penny: p

Denominations
- Banknotes: £1, £5, £10, £20, £50
- Coins: 1p, 2p, 5p, 10p, 20p, 50p, £2

Demographics
- User(s): Guernsey

Issuance
- Treasury: Treasury and Resources Department, States of Guernsey
- Website: www.gov.gg

Valuation
- Inflation: 1.9%
- Source: States of Guernsey, March 2018
- Pegged with: variant of pound sterling

The pound is the currency of Guernsey. Since 1921, Guernsey has been in currency union with the United Kingdom and the Guernsey pound is not a separate currency but is a local issue of sterling banknotes and coins, similar to the banknotes issued in Scotland, England, Wales and Northern Ireland (see Banknotes of the pound sterling). It can be exchanged at par with other sterling coinage and notes (see also sterling area).

For this reason, ISO 4217 does not include a separate currency code for the Guernsey pound; when distinction from sterling is desired the abbreviation GGP may be used.

== History ==
Until the early 19th century, Guernsey used predominantly French currency. Coins of the French livre were legal tender until 1834, with French francs used until 1921. In 1830, Guernsey began production of copper coins denominated in doubles. The double was worth 1/80 of a French franc. The name "double" derived from the French "double deniers", although the value of the coin was equal to the liard (three-denier piece) still circulating. Coins were issued in denominations of 1, 2, 4 and 8 doubles. The 8 double coin was a "Guernsey penny", with twelve to the "Guernsey shilling" (worth 1.2 francs). However, this shilling was not equal to the British shilling (worth 1.26 francs, as the exchange rate according to the respective gold standards was 25.22 francs = 1 pound sterling). Banknotes were also produced by the States of Guernsey from 1827, denominated in pounds. In 1848, an ordinance was passed that the pound sterling should be legal tender at a value of £1 1s 3d (2040 doubles). This was rescinded two years later and French currency, supplemented by local issues, continued to circulate. In 1870, British coins were made legal tender, with the British shilling circulating at 12 1/2 Guernsey pence. Bank of England notes became legal tender in 1873. In 1914, new banknotes appeared, some of which carried denominations in Guernsey shillings and francs.

After the First World War, the value of the franc began to fall relative to sterling. This caused Guernsey to adopt a pound equal to the pound sterling in 1921. For amounts below 1 shilling, the conversion rate of 1 Guernsey penny (8 doubles) = 1 British penny applied, allowing the Guernsey coins to continue to circulate. For amounts above 1 shilling, an exchange rate of 21 Guernsey shillings to the pound sterling was used, applying an approximation to the pre-war exchange rate of 25.2 francs = 1 pound sterling, rather than the exact rate of 25.22. This conversion increased the value of the double from 1/2016 to 1/1920 of a pound, or half of a farthing. The World War I issues of banknotes were overstamped with the word "British" to indicate this change. New banknotes and British silver coinage circulated alongside the double coins, with 3-pence coins minted specially for Guernsey from 1956.

In 1971, along with the rest of the British Isles, Guernsey decimalised, with the pound subdivided into 100 pence, and began issuing a full range of coin denominations from 1/2p to 50p (£1 and £2 coins followed later).

== Legal tender ==
The Guernsey pound, and other notes denominated in sterling (including those issued by the Bank of England, Scottish, Manx and Northern Irish notes and the Jersey pound) may be used in Guernsey. The Guernsey pound is legal tender only in the Bailiwick of Guernsey although it also circulates freely in Jersey, while in the UK acceptance is often problematic. It can also be exchanged in other places at banks and bureaux de change.

Around £51m of coins and notes are in circulation.

== Coins ==
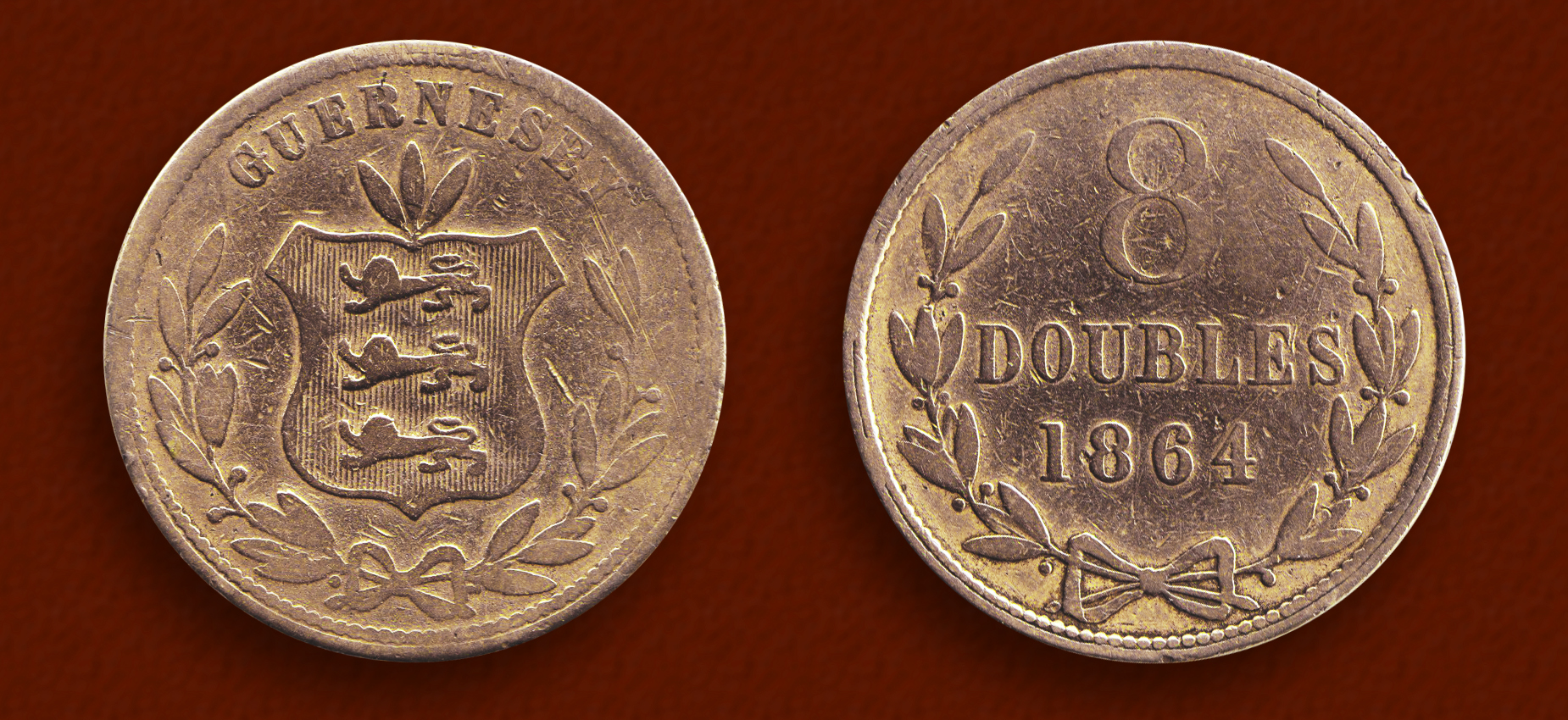
1864 Guernesey 8 Doubles

Between 1830 and 1956, Guernsey's four coin denominations, 1, 2, 4 and 8 doubles (equivalent to 1/8d, 1/4d, 1/2d and 1d respectively), all carried very similar designs, with the Island's arms and name (spelled "Guernesey") on the obverse and the denomination and date on the reverse. In addition, the 8 double coins featured a wreath on both sides.

In 1956, new designs were introduced for the 4 and 8 doubles (the lower denominations were no longer issued). These featured the Island's seal and name (now given as S'Ballivie Insule de Gernereve) on the obverse with the English name, the date and the Guernsey lily on the reverse. Threepence coins were also issued from 1956, with the same obverse and a reverse featuring the Guernsey cow.

As in the UK, 5 and 10 new pence coins were introduced in 1968, followed by 50 new pence coins in 1969, before decimalisation took place in 1971 and the 1/2, 1 and 2 new pence coins were introduced. These coins were the same size and composition as the corresponding British coins. The word "new" was dropped in 1977.

A £1 coin was introduced in 1981, two years before its introduction in the UK, although the 20 pence and £2 coins were introduced at the same time as in the UK: 1982 and 1998, respectively. The 1981 coin was significantly thinner than the modern version and the diameter also measured slightly less. The £1 coin ceased to be legal tender on 15 October 2017, to coincide with the withdrawal of the circular £1 coin in the UK. The UK's new twelve-sided £1 coin is the only £1 coin that is legal tender on the island.

The first decimal issues continued with the same obverse as the last pre-decimal issues until 1985, when Raphael Maklouf's portrait of Queen Elizabeth II was added. Ian Rank-Broadley's portrait of the Queen has appeared since 1998.

Designs on the reverses of Guernsey's decimal coins are:

Value	1968–1984	1985–present
1/2p	Numeral	—N/a
1p	Gannet	Crab
2p	Windmill	Guernsey cows
5p	Guernsey lily	Yachts
10p	Guernsey cow	Tomatoes
20p	Guernsey milk can	Cog and map
50p	Duke of Normandy's cap	Guernsey freesia
£2	—N/a	Flag

Depiction of Guernsey coinage | Reverse side
£0.01	£0.02	£0.05
Crab	Guernsey cow	Yacht
£0.10	£0.20	£0.50
Tomato	Depiction of light industry /Map of Guernsey	Guernsey Freesias
£2.00
Flag of Guernsey motif

== Banknotes ==
In 1827, the States of Guernsey introduced one-pound notes, with the Guernsey Banking Company and the Guernsey Commercial Banking Company also issuing one-pound notes from 1861 and 1886, respectively. The commercial banks lost their right to issue notes in 1914, although the notes circulated until 1924. Also in 1914, the States introduced five- and ten-shilling notes, also denominated as 6 and 12 francs.

In 1921, States notes were over-stamped with the word "British" to signify the island's conversion to a pound equal to sterling. From 1924, ten-shilling notes were issued without any reference to the franc. The five-shilling note was discontinued.

In 1941, during the German occupation, notes were introduced in denominations of 6 pence, 1 shilling 3 pence, 2 shillings 6 pence and 5 shillings. The first to be issued were the 5-shilling and 2s 6d notes. They were printed on States of Guernsey watermarked paper; the height of the notes was 2 3/8 inches (60 mm); the length of the 2s 6d note was 3 5/8 inches (92 mm) and that of the 5s note was 2 3/4 inches (70 mm). The 5s note was printed in black and red with the Seal of the Bailiwick in red on the reverse. The 2s 6d note was printed in light blue with the denomination in orange and the Seal of the Bailiwick in royal blue on the reverse. From 1942, the 1s 3d notes were overprinted to produce 1-shilling notes. In 1945, following liberation, £5 notes were introduced and production of all denominations below 10 shillings ended.

The 10 shilling note was replaced by the 50-new-pence coin in the run up to decimalisation. £10 notes were introduced in 1975, followed by £20 in 1980 and £50 in 1994. Although £1 and £2 coins have been introduced, the £1 note still circulates.

A commemorative £20 note was issued in 2012 to commemorate the Diamond Jubilee of Queen Elizabeth II. It is similar to the regular issue, but with the QE60 letter prefix, the commemorative laurel wreath on the lower left corner of the note, and additional wording. A total of 150,000 notes were issued.

A commemorative £1 note was issued on 4 July 2013 to mark 200 years since the first commercial operation of Thomas De La Rue. The commemorative note is in circulation alongside the standard £1 note, differing in the portrait of De La Rue on the reverse and a TDLR letter prefix.

On 8 November 2018, a commemorative banknote of £20 was issued to mark the 100th anniversary of the end of World War I. It is like the preceding 2012 commemorative issue, but with the seal of the Bailiwick of Guernsey surrounded by poppy flowers and containing the serial letter prefix "TG/W" (for "The Great War").

In January 2023 Guernsey advised that notes produced for the island by De La Rue plc will in future include PUREIMAGE™ and IGNITE® security threads and the NEXUS™ embedded stripe.

A new series of banknotes is set to enter circulation in 2027, with denominations of £1, £5, £10 and £20 made of polymer. Designed by Hayley Mallett, Rachael de la Mare and Natasha K. HE, the designs will not include an image of Charles III and will instead depict the island's plants, animals and buildings.

Circulating banknotes "Elizabeth II" Issue
Image		Denomination	Dimensions	Dominant colour	Description	
Obverse	Reverse	Denomination	Dimensions	Dominant colour	Obverse	Reverse
		£1	128 × 65 mm (5.0 × 2.6 in)	Green	The Market, St Peter Port	Daniel De Lisle Brock, Bailiff of Guernsey 1762–1842, The Royal Court, St Peter Port, 1840
		£1 Commemorative	128 × 65 mm (5.0 × 2.6 in)	Green	The Market, St Peter Port	Fountain Street (St. Peter Port); Thomas de la Rue, Newspaper ("Le Miroir Politique")
		£5	137 × 70 mm (5.4 × 2.8 in)	Pink	Queen Elizabeth II, The Town Church	Fort Grey, Hanois lighthouse 1862
		£10	142 × 75 mm (5.6 × 3.0 in)	Blue/orange	Queen Elizabeth II, Elizabeth College	Saumarez Park, Les Niaux Watermill, Le Trépid Dolmen
		£20	150 × 80 mm (5.9 × 3.1 in)	Pink	Queen Elizabeth II, St James Concert Hall	Vale Castle, St Sampson's Church
		£50	156 × 85 mm (6.1 × 3.3 in)	Brown	Queen Elizabeth II, Royal Court House	Point de la Mare, La Gran'mère, letter of marque, St Andrew's Church

Current GBP exchange rates
From Google Finance:	AUD CAD CHF CNY EUR HKD JPY USD JPY USD
From Yahoo! Finance:	AUD CAD CHF CNY EUR HKD JPY USD JPY USD
From XE.com:	AUD CAD CHF CNY EUR HKD JPY USD JPY USD
From OANDA:	AUD CAD CHF CNY EUR HKD JPY USD JPY USD

== See also ==
- Alderney pound
- Jersey pound
- Manx pound
