= Alderney pound =

Currency used in Alderney

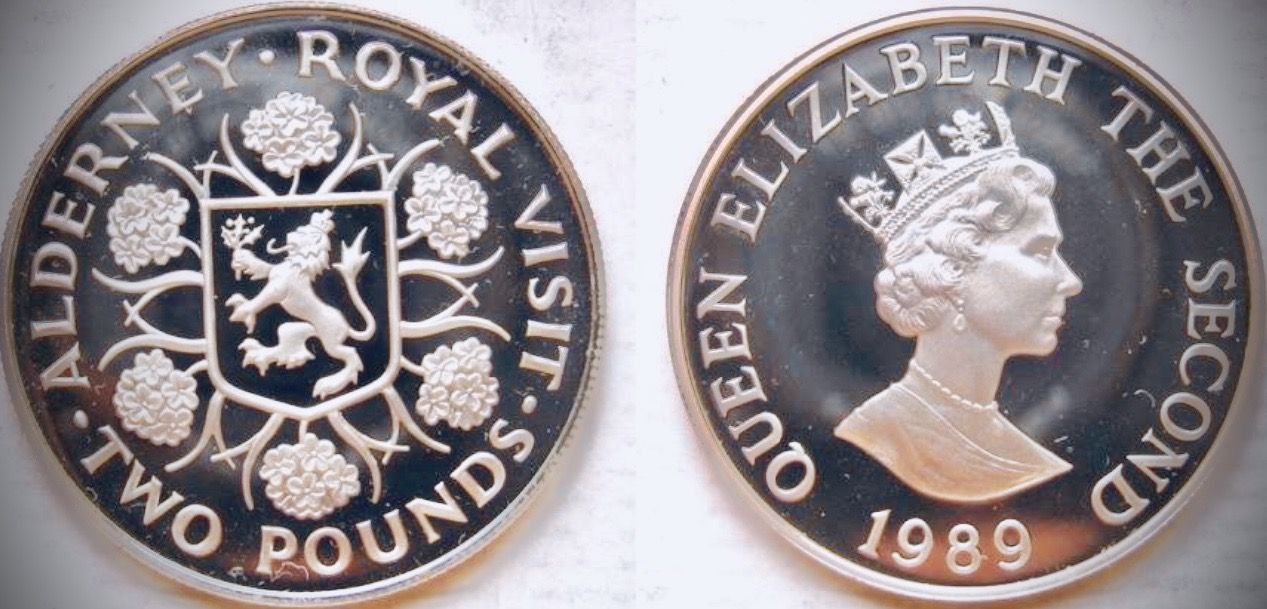

ISO 4217
- Code: none (GBP informally)

Unit
- Symbol: £

Denominations
- Subunit
- 1/100: Penny

Demographics
- User(s): Alderney

Valuation
- Pegged with: Pound sterling

The island of Alderney has its own currency, which by law must be pegged to that of the United Kingdom (see pound sterling).

Schedule 2 of the Government of Alderney Law provides that the States of Alderney may, by Ordinance, prescribe "the legal currency and denominations of the legal currency, so however that that currency, and those denominations shall be the same in Alderney as in the United Kingdom; and prescribing those notes and coins the tender of which is a legal tender of the payment of money".

In normal use in Alderney, Guernsey and Bank of England banknotes and coins circulate side by side year round, while in the summer tourist season, Jersey notes and coins are also common, as well as Scottish and occasionally even Manx or Northern Irish notes.

== Coins ==
Alderney coins are widely available to collectors but not in general circulation. Since 1989, Alderney has issued commemorative coins of £1, £2 or £5 face value in cupro-nickel, silver or gold, with a variety of designs produced.

== Banknote ==
A very rare 1 pound banknote was issued in 1810 by the Alderney Commercial Bank. It is catalogued in the Standard Catalog of World Paper Money as PS181. 1 pound. 26 December 1810. Black. Alderney coat of arms at left.

== Exchange rates ==
The Alderney pound shares the ISO code "GBP" with sterling.

Current GBP exchange rates
From Google Finance:	AUD CAD CHF CNY EUR HKD JPY USD USD
From Yahoo! Finance:	AUD CAD CHF CNY EUR HKD JPY USD USD
From XE.com:	AUD CAD CHF CNY EUR HKD JPY USD USD
From OANDA:	AUD CAD CHF CNY EUR HKD JPY USD USD

=== Literature ===
- Cuhaj, George S., ed. (2006). Standard Catalog of World Paper Money: Specialized Issues (10th ed.). Krause Publications. ISBN 0-89689-161-5.

== See also ==
- Guernsey pound
- Jersey pound
- Manx pound
