= One pound coin =

British coin, denomination of the pound sterling

One pound
- United Kingdom
- Value: £1.00 pound sterling
- Mass: (2017–present) 8.75 g (1983–2017) 9.5 g
- Diameter: 23.03–23.43 mm
- Thickness: 2.8 mm
- Edge: (2017–present) Alternately milled and plain
- Composition: Current 12-sided coin: Outer ring: nickel-brass Inner planchet: nickel-plated alloy Round coin (before 2017): nickel-brass
- Years of minting: 1983–Present

Obverse
- Design: Queen Elizabeth II
- Designer: Jody Clark
- Design date: 2016
- Design discontinued: 2022

Reverse
- Design: Rose, leek, thistle, and shamrock encircled by a coronet
- Designer: David Pearce
- Design date: 2016
- Design discontinued: 2022

The one pound coin (£1) is a denomination of modern British coinage that is worth one pound sterling: it is commonly known simply as a pound coin. Since 2024, its obverse has featured the profile of Charles III and bears the Latin engraving CHARLES III D G REX (Dei Gratia Rex) F D (Fidei defensor), which means 'Charles III, by the grace of God, King, Defender of the Faith'.

The original, round £1 coin was introduced in 1983. It replaced the Bank of England £1 note, which ceased to be issued at the end of 1984 and was removed from circulation on 11 March 1988, though still redeemable at the bank's offices, like all English banknotes. One-pound notes continue to be issued in Jersey, Guernsey and the Isle of Man, and by the Royal Bank of Scotland, but the pound coin is much more widely used. A new, dodecagonal (12-sided) design of coin was introduced on 28 March 2017 and both new and old versions of the one pound coin circulated together until the older design was withdrawn from circulation on 15 October 2017. After that date, the older coin could only be redeemed at banks, although some retailers announced they would continue to accept it for a limited time, and it remained in use in the Isle of Man.

The main purpose of redesigning the coin was to combat counterfeiting. As of March 2014 there were an estimated 1,553 million of the original nickel-brass coins in circulation, of which the Royal Mint estimated in 2014 that just over 3% were counterfeit. The new coin, in contrast, is bimetallic like the current £2 coin, and features an undisclosed hidden security feature called "iSIS" (Integrated Secure Identification Systems).

The current 12-sided pound coins are legal tender to any amount when offered in repayment of a debt; however, the coin's legal tender status is not normally relevant for everyday transactions.

The sovereign coin also has a nominal value of one pound, and remains legal tender for this amount, although the value of the gold it contains is now substantially greater than its nominal value, and so it is no longer in day-to-day circulation as currency.

== Design ==
To date, four different portraits of Elizabeth II have appeared on the obverse. For the first three of these, the inscription was ELIZABETH II D.G.REG.F.D. 2013, where 2013 is replaced by the year of minting. The fourth design, unveiled in March 2015, expanded the inscription slightly to ELIZABETH II DEI.GRA.REG.FID.DEF. 2015. The 12-sided design, introduced in March 2017, reverted to 2017 ELIZABETH II D.G.REG.F.D.

In summary:

- In 1983 and 1984 the portrait of Queen Elizabeth II by Arnold Machin appeared on the obverse, in which the Queen wears the "Girls of Great Britain and Ireland" Tiara.
- Between 1985 and 1997 the portrait by Raphael Maklouf was used, in which the Queen wears the George IV State Diadem.
- Between 1998 and 2015 the portrait by Ian Rank-Broadley was used, again featuring the tiara, with a signature-mark IRB below the portrait.
- In 2015 the portrait by Jody Clark was introduced, in which the Queen wears the George IV State Diadem, with a signature-mark JC below the portrait.

In August 2005 the Royal Mint launched a competition to find new reverse designs for all circulating coins apart from the £2 coin. The winner, announced in April 2008, was Matthew Dent, whose designs were gradually introduced into the circulating British coinage from mid-2008. The designs for the 1p, 2p, 5p, 10p, 20p and 50p coins depict sections of the Royal Shield that form the whole shield when placed together. The shield in its entirety was featured on the £1 coin. The coin's obverse remained unchanged.

The design of the reverse of the original coin was changed each year from 1983 to 2008 to show, in turn, an emblem representing the UK, Scotland, Wales, Northern Ireland, and England, together with an appropriate edge inscription. This edge inscription could just as often be "upside-down" (when obverse is facing upward). From 2008, national-based designs were still minted, but alongside the new standard version and no longer in strict rotation. The inscription ONE POUND appeared on all reverse designs.

In common with non-commemorative £2 coins, the round £1 coin (except 2004–2007 and the 2010–11 "capital cities" designs) had a mint mark: a small crosslet found on the milled edge that represents Llantrisant in South Wales, where the Royal Mint has been based since 1968.

The reverse of the new 12-sided, bimetallic pound coin, introduced on 28 March 2017, was chosen by a public design competition. The competition to design the reverse of this coin was opened in September 2014. It was won in March 2015 by 15-year-old David Pearce from Walsall, and unveiled by Chancellor of the Exchequer George Osborne during his Budget announcement. The design features a rose, leek, thistle and shamrock bound by a crown.

In October 2023 the King Charles III one-pound coin was presented; the coin features bees.

== Mintage figures ==
=== Round coin ===
Mintage figures below represent the number of coins of each date released for circulation. Mint sets have been produced since 1982; where mintages on or after that date indicate 'none', there are examples contained within those sets.

Images: Royal Mint
Year	Name	Design	Nation represented	Edge inscription	Translation	Mintage
1983	Royal Arms	Ornamental royal arms	United Kingdom	DECUS ET TUTAMEN	An ornament and a safeguard	443,053,510
1984	Thistle	Thistle and royal diadem	Scotland	NEMO ME IMPUNE LACESSIT	No one attacks me with impunity	146,256,501
1985	Leek	Leek and royal diadem	Wales	PLEIDIOL WYF I'M GWLAD	True am I to my country	228,430,749
1986	Flax Plant	Flax plant and royal diadem	Northern Ireland	DECUS ET TUTAMEN	An ornament and a safeguard	10,409,501
1987	Oak Tree	Oak tree and royal diadem	England	DECUS ET TUTAMEN	An ornament and a safeguard	39,298,502
1988	Shield of the Royal Arms	Crown over the royal arms	United Kingdom	DECUS ET TUTAMEN	An ornament and a safeguard	7,118,825
1989	Thistle	Thistle and royal diadem	Scotland	NEMO ME IMPUNE LACESSIT	No one attacks me with impunity	70,580,501
1990	Leek	Leek and royal diadem	Wales	PLEIDIOL WYF I'M GWLAD	True am I to my country	97,269,302
1991	Flax Plant	Flax plant and royal diadem	Northern Ireland	DECUS ET TUTAMEN	An ornament and a safeguard	38,443,575
1992	Oak Tree	Oak tree and royal diadem	England	DECUS ET TUTAMEN	An ornament and a safeguard	36,320,487
1993	Royal Arms	Ornamental royal arms	United Kingdom	DECUS ET TUTAMEN	An ornament and a safeguard	114,744,500
1994	Lion Rampant	Lion rampant within a double tressure flory counter-flory	Scotland	NEMO ME IMPUNE LACESSIT	No one attacks me with impunity	29,752,525
1995	Dragon	Dragon passant	Wales	PLEIDIOL WYF I'M GWLAD	True am I to my country	34,503,501
1996	Celtic Cross and Torc	Celtic cross, Broighter collar and pimpernel	Northern Ireland	DECUS ET TUTAMEN	An ornament and a safeguard	89,886,000
1997	Three Lions	Three lions passant guardant	England	DECUS ET TUTAMEN	An ornament and a safeguard	57,117,450
1998	Royal Arms	Ornamental royal arms	United Kingdom	DECUS ET TUTAMEN	An ornament and a safeguard	not circulated
1999	Lion Rampant	Lion rampant within a double tressure flory counter-flory	Scotland	NEMO ME IMPUNE LACESSIT	No one attacks me with impunity	not circulated
2000	Dragon	Dragon passant	Wales	PLEIDIOL WYF I'M GWLAD	True am I to my country	109,496,500
2001	Celtic Cross and Torc	Celtic cross, Broighter collar and pimpernel	Northern Ireland	DECUS ET TUTAMEN	An ornament and a safeguard	63,968,065
2002	Three Lions	Three lions passant guardant	England	DECUS ET TUTAMEN	An ornament and a safeguard	77,818,000
2003	Royal Arms	Ornamental royal arms	United Kingdom	DECUS ET TUTAMEN	An ornament and a safeguard	61,596,500
2004	Forth Railway Bridge	Forth Railway Bridge surrounded by railway tracks	Scotland	An incuse decorative feature symbolising bridges and pathways	—N/a	39,162,000
2005	Menai Straits Bridge	Menai Suspension Bridge surrounded by railing and stanchions	Wales	An incuse decorative feature symbolising bridges and pathways	—N/a	99,429,500
2006	Egyptian Arch Railway Bridge	Egyptian Arch Railway Bridge surrounded by railway station canopy dags	Northern Ireland	An incuse decorative feature symbolising bridges and pathways	—N/a	38,938,000
2007	Millennium Bridge	Gateshead Millennium Bridge surrounded by struts	England	An incuse decorative feature symbolising bridges and pathways	—N/a	26,180,160
2008	Royal Arms	Ornamental royal arms	United Kingdom	DECUS ET TUTAMEN	An ornament and a safeguard	3,910,000
2008	Shield of the Royal Arms	The shield from the Royal Coat of Arms	United Kingdom	DECUS ET TUTAMEN	An ornament and a safeguard	43,827,300
2009	Shield of the Royal Arms	The shield from the Royal Coat of Arms	United Kingdom	DECUS ET TUTAMEN	An ornament and a safeguard	27,625,600
2010	Shield of the Royal Arms	The shield from the Royal Coat of Arms	United Kingdom	DECUS ET TUTAMEN	An ornament and a safeguard	57,120,000
2010	London	Coat of arms of the City of London	England	DOMINE DIRIGE NOS	Lord, guide us	2,635,000
2010	Belfast	Coat of arms of Belfast	Northern Ireland	PRO TANTO QUID RETRIBUAMUS	For so much, what shall we give in return?	6,205,000
2011	Shield of the Royal Arms	The shield from the Royal Coat of Arms	United Kingdom	DECUS ET TUTAMEN	An ornament and a safeguard	25,415,000
2011	Cardiff	Coat of arms of Cardiff	Wales	Y DDRAIG GOCH DDYRY CYCHWYN	The red dragon will give the lead	1,615,000
2011	Edinburgh	Coat of arms of Edinburgh	Scotland	NISI DOMINUS FRUSTRA	In vain without the Lord	935,000
2012	Shield of the Royal Arms	The shield from the Royal Coat of Arms	United Kingdom	DECUS ET TUTAMEN	An ornament and a safeguard	35,700,030
2013	Shield of the Royal Arms	The shield from the Royal Coat of Arms	United Kingdom	DECUS ET TUTAMEN	An ornament and a safeguard	13,090,500
2013	Rose and Oak	Oak and Tudor rose	England	DECUS ET TUTAMEN	An ornament and a safeguard	5,270,000
2013	Leek and Daffodil	Leek and daffodil	Wales	PLEIDIOL WYF I'M GWLAD	True am I to my country	5,270,000
2014	Flax and Shamrock	Shamrock and flax plant	Northern Ireland	DECUS ET TUTAMEN	An ornament and a safeguard	5,780,000
2014	Thistle and Bluebell	Thistle and bluebell	Scotland	NEMO ME IMPUNE LACESSIT	No one attacks me with impunity	5,185,000
2014	Shield of the Royal Arms	The shield from the Royal Coat of Arms	United Kingdom	DECUS ET TUTAMEN	An ornament and a safeguard	79,305,200
2015	Shield of the Royal Arms	The shield from the Royal Coat of Arms (fourth portrait)	United Kingdom	DECUS ET TUTAMEN	An ornament and a safeguard	29,580,000
2015	Shield of the Royal Arms	The shield from the Royal Coat of Arms (fifth portrait)	United Kingdom	DECUS ET TUTAMEN	An ornament and a safeguard	75,000 (only in BU sets)
2015	Royal Arms	The Royal Coat of Arms (fifth portrait)	United Kingdom	DECUS ET TUTAMEN	An ornament and a safeguard	129,616,985
2016	Shield of the Royal Arms	The shield from the Royal Coat of Arms (fifth portrait)	United Kingdom	DECUS ET TUTAMEN	An ornament and a safeguard	30,000 (only in BU sets)
2016	Last Round Pound	Four heraldic beasts	United Kingdom	DECUS ET TUTAMEN	An ornament and a safeguard	Not circulated

All years except 1998 and 1999 have been issued into circulation, although the number issued has varied enormously – 1983, 1984 and 1985 in particular had large mintages to facilitate the changeover from paper notes, while some years such as 1988 are only rarely seen (although 1988 is more noticeable as it has a unique reverse). Production since 1997 has been reduced as a result of the introduction of the circulating two pound coin.

The final round coins minted for 2016 and the 2015 Shield of the Royal Arms fifth portrait did not enter circulation, as they were only available through commemorative sets. These were the shield from the Royal Coat of Arms by Matthew Dent, and a design by Gregory Cameron, Bishop of St Asaph, of four heraldic beasts.

=== 12-sided coin ===
Year	Design	Nation represented	Mintage
2016	Nations of the Crown	United Kingdom	300,000,000 (initial launch in March 2017)
2017	Nations of the Crown	United Kingdom	749,616,200
2018	Nations of the Crown	United Kingdom	130,560,000
2019	Nations of the Crown	United Kingdom	138,635,000
2020	Nations of the Crown	United Kingdom	55,840,169
2021	Nations of the Crown	United Kingdom	21,760,000
2022	Nations of the Crown	United Kingdom	7,735,000
2023	Bees	United Kingdom	10,030,000
2025	Bees	United Kingdom	9,010,000

== Counterfeiting ==
During later years of the round pound's use, Royal Mint surveys estimated the proportion of counterfeit £1 coins in circulation. This was estimated at 3.04% in 2013, a rise from 2.74%. The figure previously announced in 2012 was 2.86%, following the prolonged rise from 0.92% in 2002–2003 to 0.98% in 2004, 1.26% in 2005, 1.69% in 2006, 2.06% in 2007, 2.58% in 2008, 2.65% in 2009, 3.07% in 2010 and 3.09% in 2011. Figures were generally reported in the following year; in 2008 (as reported in 2009), the highest levels of counterfeits were in Northern Ireland (3.6%) and South East England and London (2.97%), with the lowest being in North West England. Coin testing companies estimated in 2009 that the actual figure was about twice the Mint's estimate, suggesting that the Mint was underplaying the figures so as not to undermine confidence in the coin. It is illegal to pass on counterfeit currency knowingly; the official advice is to hand it in, with details of where received, to the police, who will retain it and investigate. One article suggested that "given that fake coins are worthless, you will almost certainly be better off not even looking". The recipient also has recourse against the supplier in such cases.

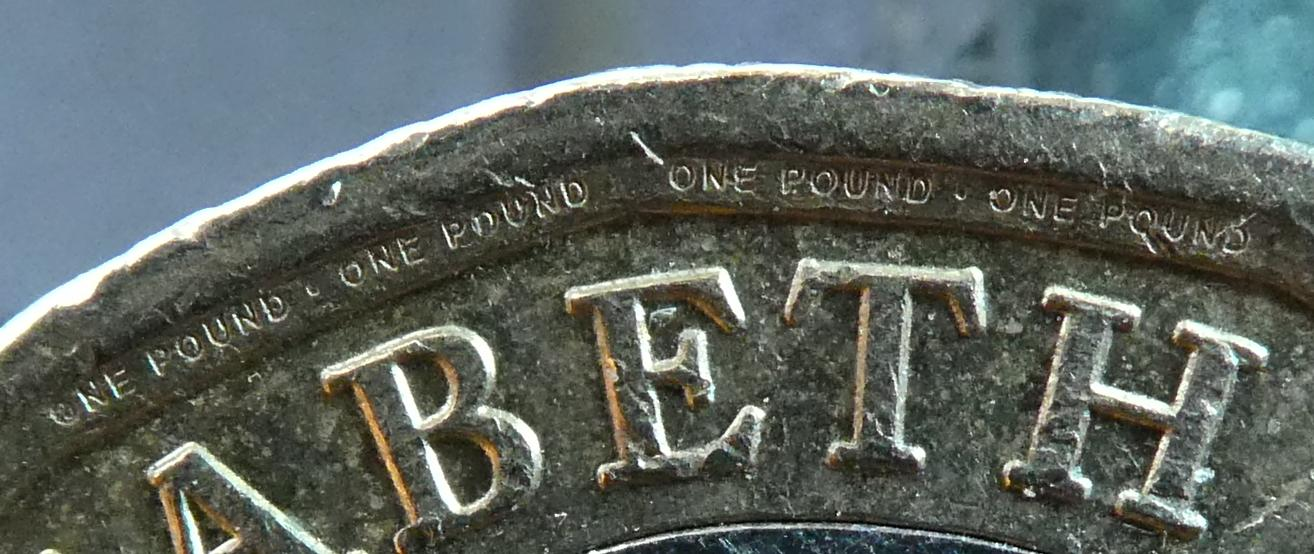
One pound coin with hard to achieve fine detail.

Counterfeits are put into circulation by dishonest people, then circulated inadvertently by others who are unaware; in many cases banks do not check, and circulate counterfeits. In 2011 the BBC television programme Fake Britain withdrew 1,000 £1 coins from each of five major banks and found that each batch contained between 32 and 38 counterfeits; the Mint estimated that about 31 per 1,000 £1 coins were counterfeit. Some of the counterfeits were found by automated machinery, others could be detected only by expert visual inspection.

In July 2010, following speculation that the Royal Mint would have to consider replacing £1 coins with a new design because of the fakes, bookmakers Paddy Power offered odds of 6/4 (bet £4 to win £6, plus the £4 stake back; decimal odds of 2.5), that the £1 coin would be removed from circulation.

Real and fake round pound, showing poor-quality edge inscription and milling, and colour difference.

Some counterfeits were of poor quality, with obviously visible differences (less sharply defined, lacking intricate details, edge milling and markings visibly wrong). Many better counterfeits can be detected by comparing the orientation of the obverse and reverse—they should match in genuine modern UK coins, but very often did not in counterfeit round £1. The design on the reverse must be correct for the stamped year (e.g., a 1996 coin should have a Celtic cross). It was difficult to manufacture round pounds with properly-produced edges; the milling (grooves) was often incomplete or poor and the inscription (often "DECUS ET TUTAMEN") sometimes poorly produced or in the wrong typeface. A shiny coin with less wear than its date suggests is also suspect, although it may be a genuine coin that has rarely been used.

Counterfeit coins are made by different processes including casting, stamping, electrotyping, and copying with a pantograph or spark erosion. In a 2009 survey, 99% of fake £1 coins found in cash centres were made of a nickel-brass, of which three fifths contained some lead and a fifth were of a very similar alloy to that used by the Royal Mint. The remaining 1% were made of simple copper-zinc brass, or lead or tin, or both. Those made of lead or tin may have a gold-coloured coating; counterfeits made of acrylic plastic containing metal powder to increase weight were occasionally found.

The final 'round pounds' were minted in December 2015; the replacement, a new 12-sided design, was introduced in 2017, the earliest dated as 2016. The coin has a 12-edged shape, similar to the pre-decimal brass threepence coin; it has roughly the same size as the previous £1 coin, and is bi-metallic like most £2 coins. The new design is intended to make counterfeiting more difficult, and also has an undisclosed hidden security feature called "iSIS" (Integrated Secure Identification Systems), thought to be a code embedded in the top layer of metal on the obverse of the coin, visible only under a specific wavelength of ultraviolet light.

Current two-pound coins, being bi-metallic (excluding some rarely tendered commemorative issues), remain harder to counterfeit than the round pound was; such counterfeits are often easily seen to have wrong colours.

== Other pound coins that entered circulation ==
While the round pound was operational, some £1 coins of British Crown Dependencies, Gibraltar and UK South Atlantic Overseas Territories entered circulation, although not legal tender in the UK. Most coins of these territories, were of the same size and composition as a UK equivalent and most bore the same portraits of the UK monarch. (Note: The early £1 issues of Guernsey and the Isle of Man differed slightly in size, the 1981 Jersey £1 even more considerably.) After the UK replaced its round pound coins, these territories did not rush to do so; Gibraltar and the Isle of Man continued to use their round pound coins as well as the new UK pound coins and the other territories withdrew their round pounds without a local replacement, adopting the English £1 by default.

== See also ==
- Banknotes of the pound sterling
- Coins of the Manx pound
- Coins of the pound sterling
- Loonie - Canadian one dollar coin, also introduced during the 1980s to replace a paper counterpart

== Source ==
- Coincraft's Standard Catalogue English & UK Coins 1066 to Date, Richard Lobel, Coincraft. ISBN 0-9526228-8-2
