= Tower Mint =

London-based private mint

Tower Mint Limited
- Type: Private company
- Industry: Coin and medal production
- Founded: AD 1976; 50 years ago
- Founder: Raphael Maklouf
- Headquarters: London, United Kingdom
- Area served: United Kingdom & British Overseas Territories
- Products: Coins; Medals; Bullion
- Website: www.towermint.co.uk

Tower Mint was founded in 1976 by acclaimed sculptor Raphael Maklouf (famous for his effigy of Queen Elizabeth II featured on many Commonwealth coins between 1985 and 1997) and has become one of the leading private mints in the UK and the last remaining mint in London.

On 1 April, 2017, Tower Mint became the official minter of Isle of Man coinage.
