= Coins of the Manx pound =

The official coinage of the Isle of Man are denominated in Manx pounds. From 1971 to 2016, coins of the Isle of Man were minted by Pobjoy Mint Limited. Since 2017, coins of the Isle of Man have been minted by the Tower Mint.

Due to matching appearance and value of pound sterling coins, these coins often appear in circulation within the United Kingdom. However, they are not legal tender there. Conversely, the Isle of Man does recognise pound sterling coins.

As well as producing non-circulating commemorative designs, the Isle of Man regularly changes the designs on the circulating coins.

The Manx pound matches the pound sterling and went decimal in 1971, with the UK, however since this date the Isle of Man has been at the forefront of coin innovation: The £1 coin was introduced on the Isle of Man in 1978, 5 years before the United Kingdom's equivalent, and there is currently a circulating £5 coin.

Below are descriptions of some of the different designs in circulation from the Isle of Man. This page does not cover non-circulating commemorative designs, such as the traditional Christmas 50 pence coins each year and the various crowns.

== One penny ==
1971-1975: Celtic cross

Reverse design: A central celtic cross, made from winding strands, with circles in the four corners between the arms of the cross.
Reverse inscription: ISLE OF MAN above the design, ONE NEW PENNY below the design.

1976-1979: Manx Loaghtan sheep

Reverse design: A standing native Manx Loaghtan sheep climbing a slight incline to left, with outline of the Isle of Man in background.
Reverse inscription: ISLE OF MAN above the design, ONE PENNY below the design.

1980-1983: Manx cat

Reverse design: A standing Manx cat facing left, with head turned to look out from the coin, surrounded with various swirling patterns underneath and across the belly of the cat.
Reverse inscription: 1 below the design, partially obscured by a decorative swirl.

1984-1987: European shag

Reverse design: A standing shag bird, facing left, on a stylised crest with tassles and other patterns surrounding.
Reverse inscription: 1 below the design.

1988-1995: Industry

Reverse design: A long industrial machine, possibly a lathe of some sort, across the centre of the design with a large industrial cog in the background - rather a difficult design to identify if you don't know what it is meant to be.
Reverse inscription: ellan vannin (the Manx name for the Isle of Man) above the design, 1 below the design.

1996-1999: Rugby

Reverse design: Large rugby ball between goalposts.
Reverse inscription: 1 below the design, with laurel wreath extending up along coin edge to either side.

2000-2003: Keeill (native Manx chapel)

Reverse design: Ruined chapel with small sanctus bell turret.
Reverse inscription: ANCIENT KEEILLS OF MANN above the design, 1 below.

2004-2016: Santon War Memorial

Reverse design: Central tapering war memorial topped by cross.
Reverse inscription: SANTON WAR MEMORIAL above the design, 1 to left of design, shield bearing the Triskeles to right of design.

== Two pence ==
1971-1975: Pair of hawking birds

Reverse design: A pair of peregrine falcons, wearing dutch hoods and bells, together on a perch. Whilst the bodies of the birds face inwards the head of each bird is turned to look away from each other towards the edges of the coin.
Reverse inscription: ISLE OF MAN above the design, TWO NEW PENCE below the design.

1976-1979: Manx shearwater (bird)

Reverse design: A native Manx shearwater bird in flight, heading upwards right, with outline of the Isle of Man in background - giving a sense of the bird flying high above the island.
Reverse inscription: ISLE OF MAN above the design, TWO PENCE below the design.

1980-1983: Red-billed chough (bird)

Reverse design: A red billed chough in flight, facing diagonally downwards left, with decorative flourishes behind.
Reverse inscription: 2 below the bird, entwined within the flourishes.

1984-1987: Peregrine falcon

Reverse design: A standing peregrine falcon facing left upon a stylised heraldic shield, with decorative flourishes behind.
Reverse inscription: 2 below the falcon but within bottom point of the shield.

1988-1995: Celtic cross

Reverse design: A cross, superimposed upon a patterned disc, with: a jug in the centre of the cross, knitting in the top arm, a goblet in the right arm, two corn cobs in the left arm and a disc in the bottom arm.
Reverse inscription: ellan vannin above the design, 2 below.

1996-1999: Cycling

Reverse design: Two cyclists riding downhill to right.
Reverse inscription: 2 below the design, with laurel wreath extending up along coin edge to either side.

2000-2003: Manx lugger fishing boat

Reverse design: Manx sailboat upon choppy waters. The inscription is taken from the first line of the Manx Fisherman's Evening Hymn and translates as "Hear us, O Lord".
Reverse inscription: CLASHT ROOIN, O HIARN above the design, 2 below.

2004-2016: Albert Tower, Ramsey

Reverse design: Central square tower with sea in background and sailing ship on horizon to right.
Reverse inscription: ALBERT TOWER above the design with small Triskeles immediately before and after, 2 to right of design.

== Five pence ==
=== Large size ===
1971-1975: Castle by the sea

Reverse design: A turreted castle with sea in foreground.
Reverse inscription: ISLE OF MAN above the design, FIVE NEW PENCE below the design.

1976-1979: Laxey Wheel

Reverse design: The Laxey Wheel, a waterwheel in the village of Laxey, with outline of the Isle of Man in background.
Reverse inscription: ISLE OF MAN above the design, FIVE PENCE below the design.

1980-1983: Manx Loaghtan sheep

Reverse design: A native Manx Loaghtan sheep, seemingly striped, walking to left with head turned back to face right, with decorative flourishes all around.
Reverse inscription: 5 below the sheep, entwined within the flourishes.

1984-1987: Cushag (flower)

Reverse design: A Cushag flower inside a jug shaped shield with floral flourishes outside the shield.
Reverse inscription: 5 below the flower but within the shield.

1988-1989: Windsurfing

Reverse design: Windsurfer travelling diagonally down the coin face to the right with stylised waves in background.
Reverse inscription: ellan vannin above the design, 5 below the design.

=== Small size ===
1990-1993: Windsurfing

Reverse design: Windsurfer travelling diagonally down the coin face to the right with stylised waves in background.
Reverse inscription: ellan vannin above the design, 5 below the design.

1994-1995: Golf clubs and golf ball
1996-1999: Golf

Reverse design: Golf ball falling into hole with golfer in background.
Reverse inscription: 5 below the design, with laurel wreath extending up along coin edge to either side.

2000-2003: Gaut's cross

Reverse design: Highly stylised and intricate Manx style celtic cross carved by Scandinavian sculptor Gaut.
Reverse inscription: GAUT'S CROSS CARVING above the design, 5 below.

2004-2016: Tower of Refuge

Reverse design: Small castle, resembling the traditional sandcastle image, surrounded by sea.
Reverse inscription: TOWER OF REFUGE above the design with small Triskeles immediately before and after, 5 below.

2017: Manx Shearwater
2023: Manx Shearwater (50th anniversary of the Manx Wildlife Trust)

== Ten pence ==
=== Large size ===
1971-1975: Triskeles

Reverse design: The Triskeles emblem of the Isle of Man.
Reverse inscription: ISLE OF MAN above the design, TEN NEW PENCE below.

1976-1979: Triskeles with map

Reverse design: The Triskeles emblem of the Isle of Man with outline of the Isle of Man in background.
Reverse inscription: ISLE OF MAN above the design, TEN PENCE below.

1980-1983: Gyrfalcon

Reverse design: A gyrfalcon perched on a branch facing towards the right but with head turned to look back to the left. Stylised swirls all around the coin and entwined through the inscription.
Reverse inscription: 10 to right of design.

1984-1987: Manx Loagthan Ram

Reverse design: A Manx Loaghtan ram facing left, standing on its hind legs with horns pointed forwards, inside a stylised shield surrounded by floral swirls around the edge.
Reverse inscription: 10 below ram but inside shield.

1988-1991: Technology on globe

Reverse design: Outline of the Isle of Man upon a globe in the background and an orbiting star horizontally across the centre foreground. An area inside the Isle of Man is covered by a small netting/portcullis effect.
Reverse inscription: ELLAN VANNIN above the design, 10 below with lines curving round the edge of the coin to the middle on either side.

=== Small size ===
1992-1995: Triskeles

Reverse design: The Triskeles emblem of the Isle of Man. The inscription is the latin motto of the Isle of Man and translates as "Whichever way you throw it, it will stand".
Reverse inscription: 20 to left of design, QUOCONQUE above the design, JECERIS STABIT below.

1996-1999: Sailing yacht
2000-2003: St. German's Cathedral

Reverse design: Ruins of the original 13th-century cathedral on St Patrick's Isle.
Reverse inscription: ST. GERMAN'S CATHEDRAL above the design, 10 below.

2004-2016: Chicken Rock lighthouse

Reverse design: Central tapering lighthouse on rock base with sea behind and cliffs on horizon to right.
Reverse inscription: LIGHTHOUSE CHICKEN ROCK above the design with small Triskeles immediately before and after, 10 to left of design.

2017: Manx Cat
2023: Lesser Mottled Grasshopper (50th anniversary of the Manx Wildlife Trust)

== Twenty pence ==
1982-1983: Medieval Norse armoury

Reverse design: A collection of medieval Norse armour and weapons amongst a filigree network of swirls. The items of armour include a winged helmet top centre above a breastplate and a round shield at bottom. A Viking ship is depicted on the centre of the shield. Various pairs of weapons cross behind the armour, starting at top: spear, battle axe, sword and dagger.
Reverse inscription: 20 below the design.

1984-1987: Atlantic herring

Reverse design: Three identical atlantic herring, one above the other, swimming from right to left but with heads turned back to face right, by Leslie Lindsay. Stylised border around the fish.
Reverse inscription: 20 below the design.

1988-1992: Combine harvester (no border)

Reverse design: A combine harvester in a field, facing towards bottom left, with ears of wheat at either side.
Reverse inscription: ellan vannin above the design, 20 below the design.

1993-1995: Combine harvester (thick border)

Reverse design: Same as above for 1988–1992, but design now changed to include a thick border around the image. This border is kept for all future twenty pence designs.
Reverse inscription: ellan vannin above the design but inside the border, TWENTY PENCE along the border around the top half of coin, 20 below the design, half inside the border and half on the border.

1996-1999: Rallying

Reverse design: Subaru Impreza leading a Ford Escort Cosworth round a downhill right hand bend.
Reverse inscription: TWENTY PENCE above the design, 20 below the design, with laurel wreath extending up along coin edge to either side.

2000-2003: Rushen Abbey

Reverse design: Monk sitting at desk at work creating manuscript. Rays of light fall from an arched window in the background.
Reverse inscription: RUSHEN ABBEY above the design, 20 below.

2004-2016: Rushen Castle clock

Reverse design: Clock face at 12 o'clock inside a square diamond.
Reverse inscription: CASTLE RUSHEN CLOCK above the design with small Triskeles immediately before and after, 20 below.

2017: Viking-era Longboat
2023: Mountain hare (50th anniversary of the Manx Wildlife Trust)

== Fifty pence ==
=== Large size - standard design ===
1971-1975: Viking longship on sea

Reverse design: A viking longship sailing to front right on a sea. Sailors and steering oar are visible alongside.
Reverse inscription: ISLE OF MAN above the design, FIFTY PENCE below.

1976-1979: Viking longship with map

Reverse design: A viking longship sailing to left with outline of the Isle of Man in background. An eagle motif is shown on the sail and you can see the heads of the sailors and the sailor steering at the stern on the right.
Reverse inscription: ISLE OF MAN above the design, FIFTY PENCE below.

1980-1983: Viking longship

Reverse design: A viking longship, with large checked sail and steering oar back left, on a stylised sea and with scrollwork above. You can also make out the heads of the sailors within the boat.
Reverse inscription: 50 below the design, entwined with swirls.

1984-1987: Viking longship in shield

Reverse design: A viking longship within a sylised shield. The sail of the ship is rolled up rather than being full. No sailors are visible.
Reverse inscription: 50 below the design.

1988-1997: Computer age

Reverse design: An early computer inside two concentric circles and depicting a simple Triskeles design on the screen composed of horizontal lines.
Reverse inscription: ellan vannin above the design, 50 below.

=== Large size - commemorative issues ===
1979: Tynwald Day - Commemorating the millennial anniversary of Tynwald's establishment

Reverse design: A viking longship sailing to front left on a sea. A lighthouse (presumably the Chicken Rock lighthouse) is shown in the background to the right of the ship. On the sail is a wheel with three spokes in the rough shape of the Triskeles.
Reverse inscription: ISLE OF MAN above the design, FIFTY PENCE below, both following edge of coin. DAY OF TYNWALD, JULY 5TH immediately beneath the longship and manx millennium viking voyage around the image on the ship's sail .
Edge inscription: H·M Q·E-II ROYAL VISIT I·O·M JULY 1979

1981: Isle of Man TT race commemorative issue - Joey Dunlop

Reverse design: Motorcycle number 3 leaning into a left hand corner towards front right. TT trophy behind the rider and laurel wreaths reaching up either side of the coin edge.
Reverse inscription: TT above the design, 50 below.

1982: Isle of Man TT race commemorative issue - Mick Grant

Reverse design: Motorcycle number 10 leaning into a right hand corner towards viewer. Laurel wreaths reaching up either side of the coin edge.
Reverse inscription: TT above the design, 50 below.

1983: Isle of Man TT race commemorative issue - Ron Haslam

Reverse design: Motorcycle number 14 facing right whilst leaning into a right hand corner. Laurel wreaths reaching up either side of the coin edge.
Reverse inscription: TT above the design, 50 below.

1984: Isle of Man TT race commemorative issue - Mick Boddice

Reverse design: Motorcycle and sidecar number 3 facing front right. Laurel wreaths reaching up either side of the coin edge.
Reverse inscription: TT above the design, 50 below.

1994: Commemorating the centenary of the Legislative Building in Douglas, meeting place of the Tynwald

Reverse design: The Legislative Building in Douglas above a sword pointing left with 1894 above the sword tip and 1994 above the pommel.
Reverse inscription: LEGISLATIVE BUILDING CENTENARY above the design, 50 below.

=== Small size ===
1997–1999: Isle of Man TT races - commemorating the centenary of the island's famous TT races

Reverse design: Two motorcycles, number 9 leading number 4, facing front whilst negotiating right hand bend. Reputed to be Phillip McCallen and Nigel Davies.
Reverse inscription: TT 100 YEARS above the design, 50 below, with laurel wreath extending up along coin edge to either side.

2000-2003: Pre-Norse carved cross

Reverse design: Upright carved cross with rays emanating from centre - taken from a pre-Norse carved altar frontal now held in the Manx Museum.
Reverse inscription: CHRISTIANITY IN MANN above the design, 50 below.

2004-2016: Milner's Tower

Reverse design: Square tower with round side turret.
Reverse inscription: MILNER'S TOWER above the design with small Triskeles immediately before and after, 50 below.

2017: Manx Loagthan
2023: Peregrine Falcon (50th anniversary of the Manx Wildlife Trust)

=== Small size - Commemorative issues ===
1999: Isle of Man TT race commemorative issue - Leslie Graham

Reverse design: Motorcycle number 4 facing right, leaning into a left hand turn. Laurel wreaths reaching up either side of the coin edge.
Reverse inscription: 50 below the design.

2004, 2007: Isle of Man TT race commemorative issue - Tourist Trophy

Reverse design: The Isle of Man TT trophy with outline of the Isle of Man in background. The Isle of Man TT logo to right of image.
Reverse inscription: 50 below the design.

2007: Isle of Man TT race commemorative issue - Celebrating 100 years of races, featuring Dave Molyneux

Reverse design: Motorcycle and sidecar number 1 facing front right. Laurel wreaths reaching up either side of the coin edge.
Reverse inscription: TT 100 YEARS above the design, 50 below.

2009: Isle of Man TT race commemorative issue - Honda 50th Anniversary of World Championship Racing

Reverse design: Honda motorcycle facing front ledft, leaning into right hand turn. TT logo to right of image.
Reverse inscription: WORLD CHAMPIONSHIP RACING above the design with wing above, 1959-2009 immediately below design and 50 at bottom.

== One pound ==
In 1978 the Pobjoy Mint produced the world's first modern pound coin for the Isle of Man, which it proudly called the round pound. The Manx government did intend that this coin should circulate. However, the Manx population did not like the coin, and to this day they prefer their pound notes, which are still produced.

1978-1982: Triskelion on map

Reverse design: the Triskelion set over a map of the island, with fleur-de-lis on either side and the legend “· ISLE OF MAN · ONE POUND” around the edge, along with small die letters (e.g. AA, AB) usually placed on the map near the “N” in ONE. While this core design remains unchanged, several special variations appear by year: the 1979 issue includes a small triskelion in a circle above the “O” in POUND to mark the millennium of Tynwald, with some versions instead showing crossed oars; 1980 coins may carry additional inscriptions commemorating events such as the Isle of Man TT and the Daily Mail Ideal Home Exhibition; and certain 1982 pieces replace die letters with a “baby cradle” privy mark celebrating the birth of Prince William.

1983-1986: Manx Towns series

Reverse design: 1983 Peel features Peel Castle and Cathedral within a garter. 1984 Castletown features the Arms of Castletown. 1985 Ramsey features the arms of Ramsey, only featured in the 1985 proof set. 1986 Douglas features the arms of Douglas, featuring a shield of arms.

1987: Viking horse rider
1988-1995: Mobile phone
1996-1999: Cricket
2000-2003: Millennium bells

Reverse design: The Triskeles with three church bells alternating between the legs.
Reverse inscription: MILLENNIUM BELLS above the design, ONE POUND below.

2004-2016: Tynwald Hill and St. John's chapel,

Reverse design: The stepped embankments of Tynwald Hill are half shown to the left with the chapel in the background to the right.
Reverse inscription: TYNWALD HILL · ST. JOHN'S CHAPEL above the design, 1 POUND below.

2017: Peregrine Falcon and Raven
2023: Grey Seal (50th anniversary of the Manx Wildlife Trust)

== Two pounds ==
2000-2003: Thorwald's cross-slab

Reverse design: Taken from a 10th-century cross design depicting the battle of Ragnarök.
Reverse inscription: THORWALD'S CROSS-SLAB above the design, TWO POUNDS below.

2004-2016: Peel Castle

Reverse design: Large central round tower with hut-like buildings to right and see inlet to left.
Reverse inscription: ROUND TOWER PEEL CASTLE above the design with small Triskeles immediately before and after, TWO POUNDS below.

2017: Tower of Refuge
2023: Basking Shark (50th anniversary of the Manx Wildlife Trust)

== Five pounds ==
Five pound coins have been legal tender on the island since 1981 but they had previously been sold as collections, most people would "not even know of their existence", until in 2017 the government issued 20,000 into circulation.

2000-2003: St. Patrick's hymn

Reverse design: Very stylised St Patrick's cross.
Reverse inscription: ST. PATRICK'S HYMN above the design, 5 POUNDS below.

2004-2016: Laxey Wheel,

Reverse design: Image of the large 72-foot-diameter (22 m) Laxey water wheel.
Reverse inscription: LAXEY WHEEL above the design, 5 POUNDS below.

2017: Triskelion
2023: Queen Scallop (50th anniversary of the Manx Wildlife Trust)
