= Unidad de Valor Constante =

Unidad de Valor Constante (Spanish) UVC

ISO 4217
- Code: ECV

Demographics
- Date of introduction: May 28, 1993
- User(s): Ecuador

Valuation
- Value: 1 ECV = 10,000 ECS
- This infobox shows the latest status before this currency was rendered obsolete.

The Unidad de Valor Constante (UVC) was a currency created by the "Ley de Valores" of Ecuador in 1993, and abolished with dollarization in the presidency of Jamil Mahuad on January 9, 2000. It was meant to help deal with the high levels of inflation experienced under the sucre. The 1 UVC was specified at its introduction (May 28, 1993) to equal 10,000 sucres. Its value was adjusted daily by the "Instituto Nacional de Estadísticas y Censos" (INEC) in line with the rate of inflation.

It had the ISO 4217 currency code ECV.
