= Australian Platinum Koala =

Australian coin

The obverse and reverse of the Platinum Koala (1991)

The Platinum Koala is an Australian platinum bullion coin minted by the Perth Mint between 1988 and 2008. The Platinum Koala is notionally legal tender, that is a legal means of payment (in Australia).

On 18 June 1987, the Australian Government approved the minting of platinum and silver coins. This decision was made based on the success of gold coins issued a year earlier. The minting of the coin began in September 1988 in Perth. For marketing purposes, 2 ounce, 10 ounce and 1 kilogram coins of silver, gold and platinum were introduced in 1991; the 1 kg coins were the world's heaviest bullion coins at the time. The production of the Platinum Koala was stopped in 2000 due to a lack of a demand. In 2000, only 2,048 out of a total possible mintage of 100,000 were struck.

The obverse depicts the Queen of Australia, Elizabeth II, and the reverse contains an image of a koala. The initials "JB" of the reverse face designer John Bergdahl are present on most coins. Other designers of the coin include Raphael Maklouf (1990, 1991, 1996, 1998), Miranda Cornell (1998) and Darryl Bellotti (2010). The annual series contain coins weighing from 1/20 ounce to 1 kilogram.

Weight	1/20 oz	1/10 oz	1/4 oz	1/2 oz	1 oz	2 oz	10 oz	1 kg
Face value, $	5	10	25	50	100	200	1,000	3,000
Thickness, mm	1.32	1.4	1.9	2.03	2.7	3.8	7.9	13.9
Diameter, mm	14.1	16.1	20.1	25.1	32.1	40.6	60.3	75.3

The Platinum Koala never reached the popularity of the American Platinum Eagle, mostly because it has not been advertised in the US. Like most investment platinum coins, Platinum Koalas are sealed in a protective plastic case. The coins are sold at prices that reflect the current price of platinum, and not at the face value printed on the coin. Since November 1986, Perth Mint has used more than 18 tonnes of platinum for minting. About 85% of them were sold abroad making the Gold Corporation (owner of the Mint) one of Australia's top 30 export earners.

== See also ==
- American Platinum Eagle
- Australian Silver Kangaroo (bullion)
- Australian Silver Koala
- Australian Silver Kookaburra
- Platinum as an investment
- Canadian Platinum Maple Leaf
- Chinese Platinum Panda
