= Chinese Panda coins =

Chinese bullion coin

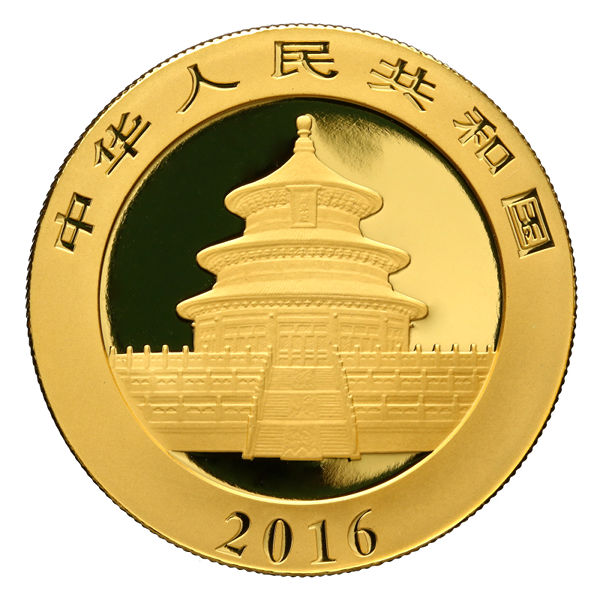
30g China Panda gold coin, 2016, back

Chinese Panda coins are platinum, gold, and silver bullion coins issued by the People's Bank of China.

Issued first in 1982, the coins are produced in various sizes to satisfy demands from investors and collectors, the series changes the depiction on the coin with each new year.

- Chinese Platinum Panda (produced from 1987 to 2005)
- Chinese Silver Panda
- Chinese Gold Panda
