= Canadian Platinum Maple Leaf =

Official bullion platinum coin of Canada

Platinum Maple Leaf
- Canada
- Value: 50 Canadian dollars (face value only)
- Mass: 31.110 g (1.00 troy oz)
- Diameter: 30 mm
- Edge: Serrated
- Composition: 99.95% Pt
- Years of minting: 1988–2002 (five denominations); 2009–present (1 oz only)

Obverse
- Design: King Charles III
- Designer: Susanna Blunt
- Design date: 2022

Reverse
- Design: Maple Leaf
- Designer: RCM engravers
- Design date: 1988

The Canadian Platinum Maple Leaf is the official bullion platinum coin of Canada. First issued by the Royal Canadian Mint in 1988, it was available until 2002 in five different denominations, all of which are marked as containing .9995 pure platinum. The bullion coin was partly reintroduced in 2009 in the form of the 1 troy ounce denomination in .9999 purity, featuring a new portrait of Queen Elizabeth II on the obverse. The coins have legal tender status in Canada, but as is often the case with bullion coins, the face values of these coins is lower than the market price of the material they are made from.

== Background ==
The Canadian Maple Leaf series began in 1979, when the Royal Canadian Mint (RCM) introduced the Canadian Gold Maple Leaf coin. It consisted of 1 troy ounce of .999 pure gold – later refined to .9999 pure in 1984 – and contained no alloys within it; a rarity at the time. Due to the widespread success of the coin on the international bullion market – which saw the Gold Maple Leaf secure "the top sales spot" to become "the world's most successful gold coin" – the Mint decided to introduce silver and platinum bullion coins to the series in 1988. In that year, Canada ranked third in the world in platinum production, trailing only South Africa and the Soviet Union.

== History ==
The production of Platinum Maple Leaf coins began on September 22, 1988, at a "special striking ceremony" organized by the RCM, where the first Canadian Silver Maple Leaf was also made. The president of the largest precious metal distributor in Japan, Junichiro Tanaka, was given the honor of striking the first platinum coin with a coin press weighing 140 tonnes. At the time, the Gold Maple Leaf was extremely popular in Japan, with 1.1 million ounces of the coin sold there from 1984 onwards. This represented more than 70% of the market share in that country.

Both coins were first made available for sale to the public on November 17 of that same year. The platinum coins were made of .9995 pure platinum in four denominations of different sizes, consisting of 1 troy ounce (oz), 1/2 oz, 1/4 oz and 1/10 oz. bearing the face values of $50, $20, $10, and $5, respectively. Their actual value, however, is determined by the daily market price of platinum. These coins featured the effigy of Queen Elizabeth II designed by Arnold Machin, which was also used in the United Kingdom and throughout the Commonwealth of Nations, and continued to be used on Canadian coins until 1989. Coins made of 1/20 oz platinum with a face value of $1 were subsequently released in 1993, with the intention of attracting the small investment and jewelry sectors.

On December 15, 1988, almost a month after the Platinum Maple Leaf was first sold, Ford Motor Company announced that it was testing out a new material for its catalytic converters that would replace platinum. This led to fears that the sale of the platinum coins would decrease, as the automotive industry was responsible for approximately a third of platinum consumption. Although the sales of the Platinum Maple Leaf more than doubled from 1990 to 1991 – increasing from 18,000 to 39,000 ounces (from 510.3 to 1,105.6 kg) – this was primarily because the price of the precious metal had "dropped substantially". For a short time during the earlier part of 1991, platinum had actually become less valuable than gold. However, the situation reversed by the latter part of the decade, when the increased interest in platinum caused the coin's prices to rapidly increase. Because of this, the platinum market suddenly cooled off, and the RCM stopped minting Platinum Maple Leaf coins after 2002. However, they began producing the coin again in 2009, this time featuring the effigy of Queen Elizabeth II designed by Susanna Blunt back in 2003. In 2012, the Platinum Maple Leaf was "the world's best selling platinum coin".

== Series ==
Years	Denominations	Purity	Obverse
1988–1989	1 oz, 1/2 oz, 1/4 oz, 1/10 oz	.9995	39-year-old Queen
1990–1992	1 oz, 1/2 oz, 1/4 oz, 1/10 oz	.9995	64-year-old Queen
1993	1 oz, 1/2 oz, 1/4 oz, 1/10 oz, 1/20 oz	.9995	64-year-old Queen
1994	1 oz, 1/2 oz, 1/4 oz, 1/10 oz, 1/15 oz, 1/20 oz	.9995	64-year-old Queen
1995–1999	1 oz, 1/2 oz, 1/4 oz, 1/10 oz, 1/20 oz	.9995	64-year-old Queen
2002	1 oz, 1/2 oz, 1/4 oz, 1/10 oz, 1/20 oz	.9995	64-year-old Queen
2009	1 oz	.9995	79-year-old Queen

== See also ==
- American Platinum Eagle
- Bullion
- Bullion coin
- Inflation hedge
- Platinum as an investment
- Platinum Koala
- Platinum Panda
