= Chinese Platinum Panda =

1987–2005 platinum coin series in China

The Chinese Platinum Panda is a series of platinum coins of China produced from 1987 to 2005. (Note: Images of these coins do not fall under a Wikipedia-compatible license, but can be found at numismatic sites.) The series is named after the image of giant panda printed on the reverse of all coins. The People's Bank of China minted 8,300 one-ounce Platinum Panda coins between 1987 and 1990, with a face value of 100 yuan. Additionally, 5,450 ounces (154.5 kg) of platinum were used for coins of smaller denominations in the 1990s through the first decade of the 21st century. Minting was discontinued in 2005, mostly due to the increasing price of platinum; while in 1990 the price was about US$490/oz, it crossed the $2,000 mark in the summer of 2008. All Platinum Pandas, except for coins of 2004–2005, are very rare and their availability cannot be judged from the minted volumes.

== Mintages ==
Platinum Panda (ratings and circulation)
Year	Value, Yuan	Diameter, mm	Weight, g	# pcs.
1987	100	32	31.1	2,000
1988	100	32	31.1	2,000
1989	100	32	31.1	3,000
1990	100	32	31.1	1,300
1990	50	27	15.55	2,500
1990	25	22	7.8	3,500
1990	10	18	3.1	4,500
1993	10	18	3.1	2,500
1993	5	14	1.55	2,500
1994	10	18	3.1	5,000
1995	10	18	3.1	5,000
1995	5	14	1.55	10,000
1996	10	18	3.1	2,500
1996	5	14	1.55	5,000
1997	10	18	3.1	2,500
1997	5	14	1.55	5,000
2002 (Note: The 2002 issue is dedicated to the 20th anniversary of the printing of the Chinese Panda Gold Coin.)	100	18	3.1	20,000
2003	50	14	1.55	50,000
2004	50	14	1.55	50,000
2005	100	18	3.1	30,000

== See also ==
- Chinese Gold Panda
- Chinese Silver Panda
- Platinum coin
