= Platinum coin =

Coin in platinum metal

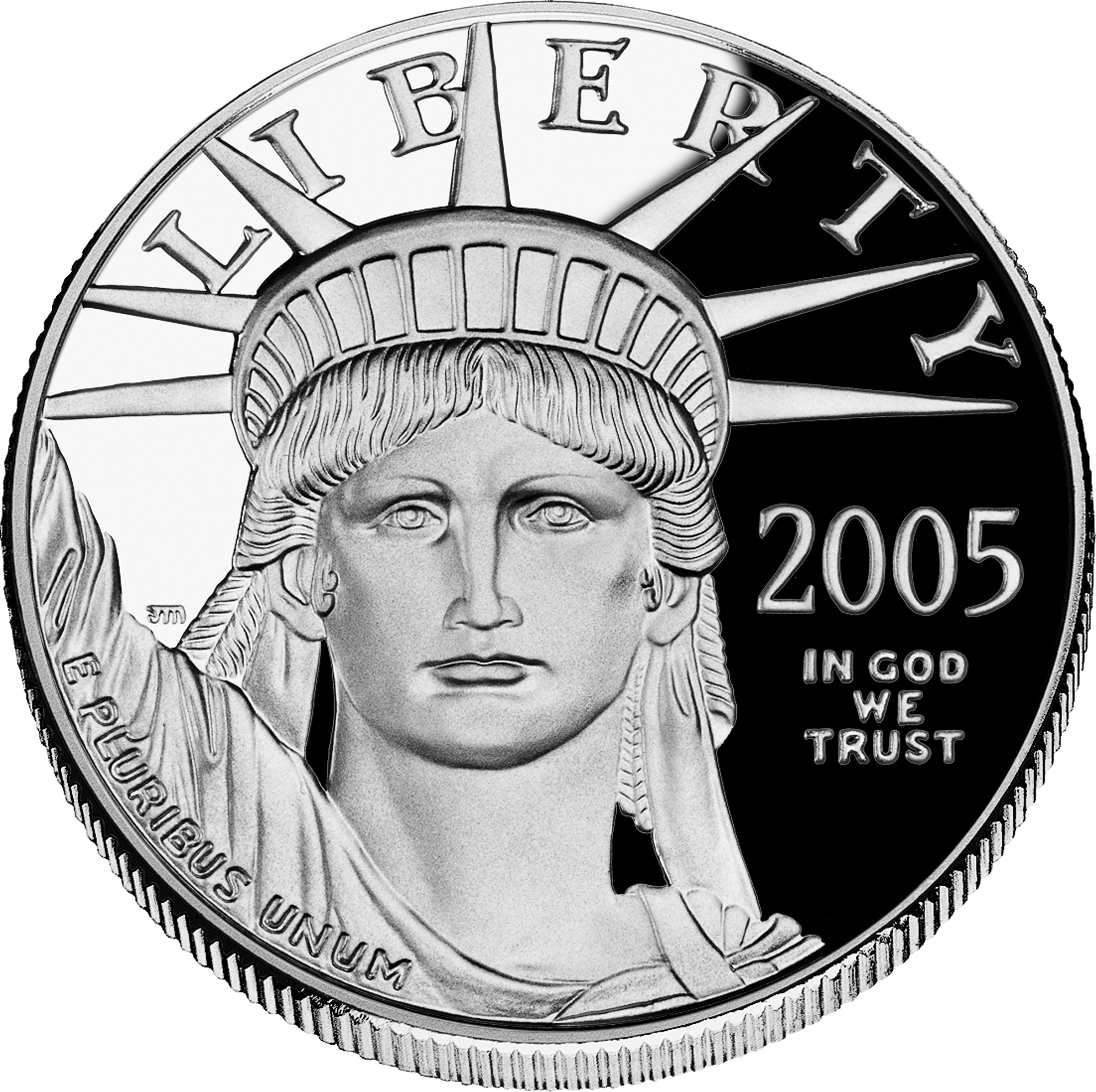
Common obverse of the American Eagle coins

Platinum coins are a form of currency. Platinum has an international currency symbol under ISO 4217 of XPT. Platinum coins were first issued by Spain in Spanish-colonized America in the 18th century and continued by the Russian Empire in the 19th century. Unlike the more malleable and ductile silver and gold, platinum is denser and melts at a higher temperature than other metals.

Major platinum bullion coins include the American Platinum Eagle, the Canadian Platinum Maple Leaf, the Australian Platinum Koala, the Manx Noble, the Chinese Platinum Panda, the Austrian Vienna Philharmonic and several series by the Soviet Union and later by the Russian Federation. Commemorative coin sets have been issued starting from 1978 and became popular among coin collectors.

== History ==
Platinum was first used for minting coins in Spanish-colonized America. Following the discovery of platinum among gold ore, the Spaniards were unable to use the platinum initially because they had no technology for processing the metal which only melts at a very high temperature. The then-cheap platinum was used for various kinds of frauds, such as substituting it for the more expensive silver, even though platinum is many times scarcer than silver, and even 30 times scarcer than gold. After the discovery that platinum alloys with gold, counterfeiters began to add it to gold coins. Later, the practice of adding platinum to gold as a ligature was adopted by the authorities in Spain in order to lower the gold content of coins. Also in Spain, in the mid-19th century, counterfeiters began producing British Sovereigns out of a gold-plated alloy of platinum and copper, relying on a similar specific weight of platinum and gold.

In 1814, the United States struck a pattern half dollar in platinum.

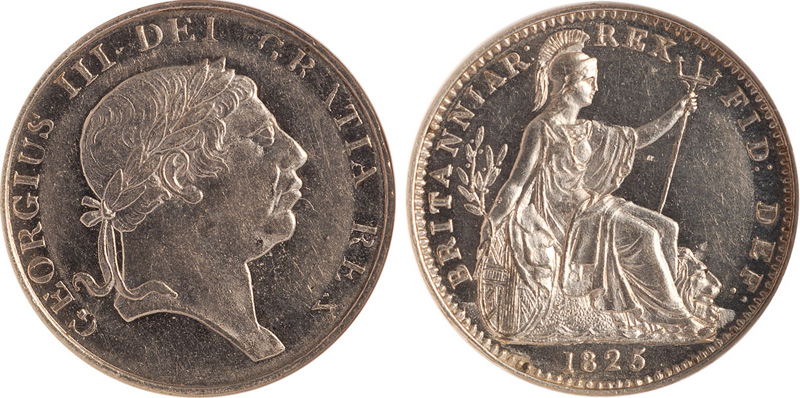
Experimental mule sample manufactured in the United Kingdom. The obverse is the 1812 Pattern 9 Pence Bank Token (S3773A), and reverse is the farthing of 1825. George III had died in 1820 and had been succeeded by his son (George IV) whose farthing reverse design is shown (right).

In the late 1820s, the British Royal Mint produced several trial coins as part of experiments on the use of platinum in coins. One of these coins has the same diameter as a farthing and a weak relief owing to the high hardness of platinum. The 1812 Pattern 9 Pence Bank Token (S3773A) was used for the obverse and the farthing of 1825 for the reverse parts of this coin. No dies were manufactured for these experiments, so expired dies of the corresponding coins were used instead. Coins minted using dies from two different coins are called mules. The coin bears the year of 1825 but was likely printed at a later date. Like all test coins, the platinum farthing has a high historic and numismatic value. This coin is also interesting because it features the portrait of the already deceased monarch George III (1738–1820).

Platinum coins were used as a regular national currency in Russia, where coins were circulated between 1828 and 1845. Merchants valued platinum coins because their higher melting point meant that they were less likely to be melted in a house fire like gold or silver coins often were. After ceasing production in 1845, the minting of platinum coins resumed in 1977. Between 1977 and 1980, in preparation for the 1980 Summer Olympics, the Soviet Union produced five commemorative coin sets, and since 1988 commemorative platinum coins were issued every year. The practice of regularly issuing platinum coins has continued in modern Russia, and since 1992 the Central Bank of Russia has released 16 sets of platinum coins.

Since 1983, other countries have begun regularly minting platinum coins. Notable examples include the Platinum cat, and Platinum Noble by the Isle of Man, Canadian Platinum Maple Leaf, Chinese Platinum Panda and Australian Platinum Koala.

The minting of a trillion-dollar platinum coin was proposed as a solution to the 2023 United States debt-ceiling crisis.

== Platinum coin series ==
Country	Name	Release year
United States	American Platinum Eagle	1997–Present
Canada	Canadian Platinum Maple Leaf	1988–1999, 2002
Isle of Man	Platinum Noble	1983–1989, 2016
Isle of Man	Platinum Cat	?
Australia	Platinum Koala	1988–2010
China	Chinese Platinum Panda	1988–2005
Austria	Vienna Philharmonic	2016–Present
United Kingdom	Britannia	2018-Present

== Single issues ==
Many commemorative coins were dedicated to a significant event or anniversary and issued only once. For example, Estonia released a platinum coin in 2008 to honor its 90th anniversary, and Tonga issued 400 platinum coins in 1967 for the coronation of Taufa'ahau Tupou IV. Other countries that have minted commemorative platinum coins include Bulgaria, Congo, Panama, South Africa, Portugal and France.

The Estonian issue began on 24 February 2008 – Independence Day – and included silver, gold and platinum coins. The platinum coin was a first for Estonia. Its reverse featured a barn swallow – the national symbol of Estonia – and the obverse showed the national coat of arms. The coin had a face value of 100 Estonian kroons, a platinum purity of 999/1000, a weight of 7.775 grams, and a diameter of 18.0 mm. The coin was designed by Tiit Jϋrna and produced by the Mint of Finland with a quantity of 3,000 pieces. The opening sale took place in the Hall of Independence at the National Bank, where the independence of Estonia was proclaimed 90 years ago; 349 coins and 176 sets were sold within three and a half hours. The entire issue is now sold out.

== Investing in coins and their storage ==
Platinum coins are a popular investment, and each year many such coins are sold by Sberbank of Russia among other mints. Most experts agree that such investments should have a long-term profile. Many bullion coins are sealed in transparent plastic directly after removal from the press. They are then often stored in a dry room with relative humidity below 80% and at temperatures between 15 and 40 °C. If a coin is removed from its plastic seal, it is recommended not to store it in PVC albums, as PVC molecules gradually break down, releasing organochlorine compounds which produce patina on the metal. These compounds may also form acids by reacting with moisture. Unlike silver, platinum does not corrode.

== See also ==
- Platinum coins of Russia:
  - Platinum coins of the Russian Empire
  - Platinum coins of the Soviet Union
  - Platinum coins of the Russian Federation
- Precious metal coins
  - Gold coin
  - Silver coin
  - Palladium coin
- Platinum as an investment
- Trillion-dollar coin
- 1814 platinum half dollar

== Bibliography ==
- Bruce, Colin R. & Michael, Thomas (1991). Standard Catalog of World Coins 1901–2000. Krause Publications. ISBN 0-89689-500-9.
- Chester L. Krause; Clifford Mishler (2003). 2004 standard catalog of world coins: 1901–present. Krause Publications. ISBN 0-87349-593-4.
