= Trillion-dollar coin =

Proposed denomination of coinage in the United States

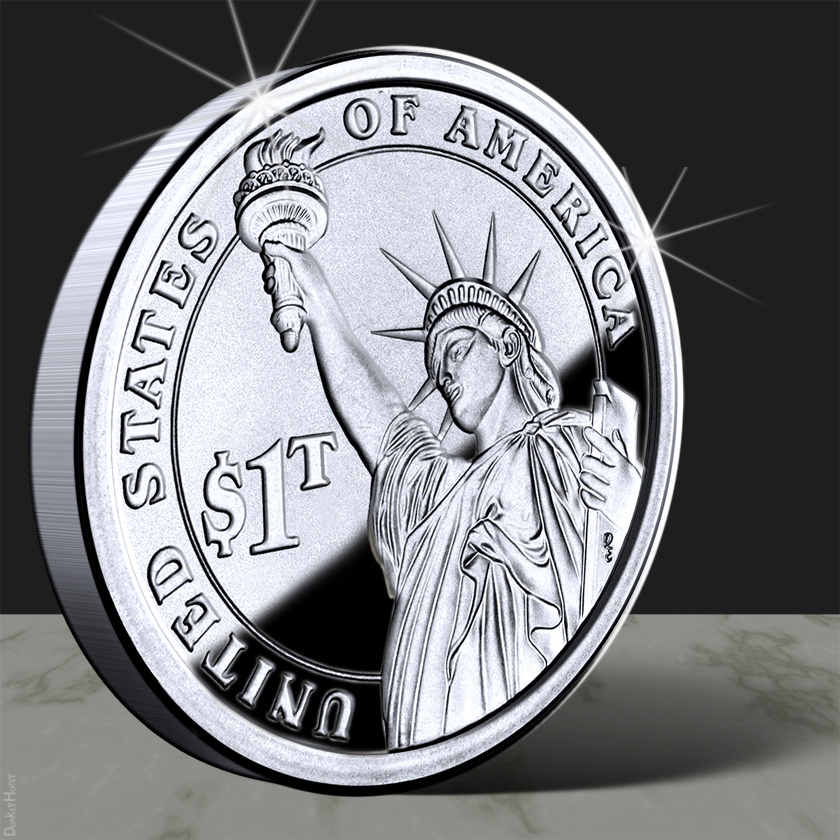
Artist's concept of a trillion-dollar coin, featuring a similar obverse design to the reverse of the presidential dollar series.

The trillion-dollar coin is a concept that emerged during the 2011 United States debt-ceiling crisis as a proposed way to bypass any necessity for the United States Congress to raise the country's borrowing limit, through the minting of very high-value platinum coins. The concept gained more mainstream attention by late 2012 during the debates over the United States fiscal cliff negotiations and renewed debt-ceiling discussions, and reached the headlines during the week of January 7, 2013. The Federal Reserve and the Treasury ultimately rejected use of the trillion-dollar coin concept.

Congresswoman Rashida Tlaib reintroduced the concept of the trillion-dollar coin in March 2020 in the form of a congressional proposal during the shutdown caused by the COVID-19 pandemic in the United States. Tlaib sought to fund monthly $2,000 recurring stimulus payments until the end of the pandemic.

The idea gained further traction in late 2021 with propositions by Bloomberg journalist Joe Weisenthal among others, amid the 2021 United States debt-ceiling crisis.

== Legal basis ==
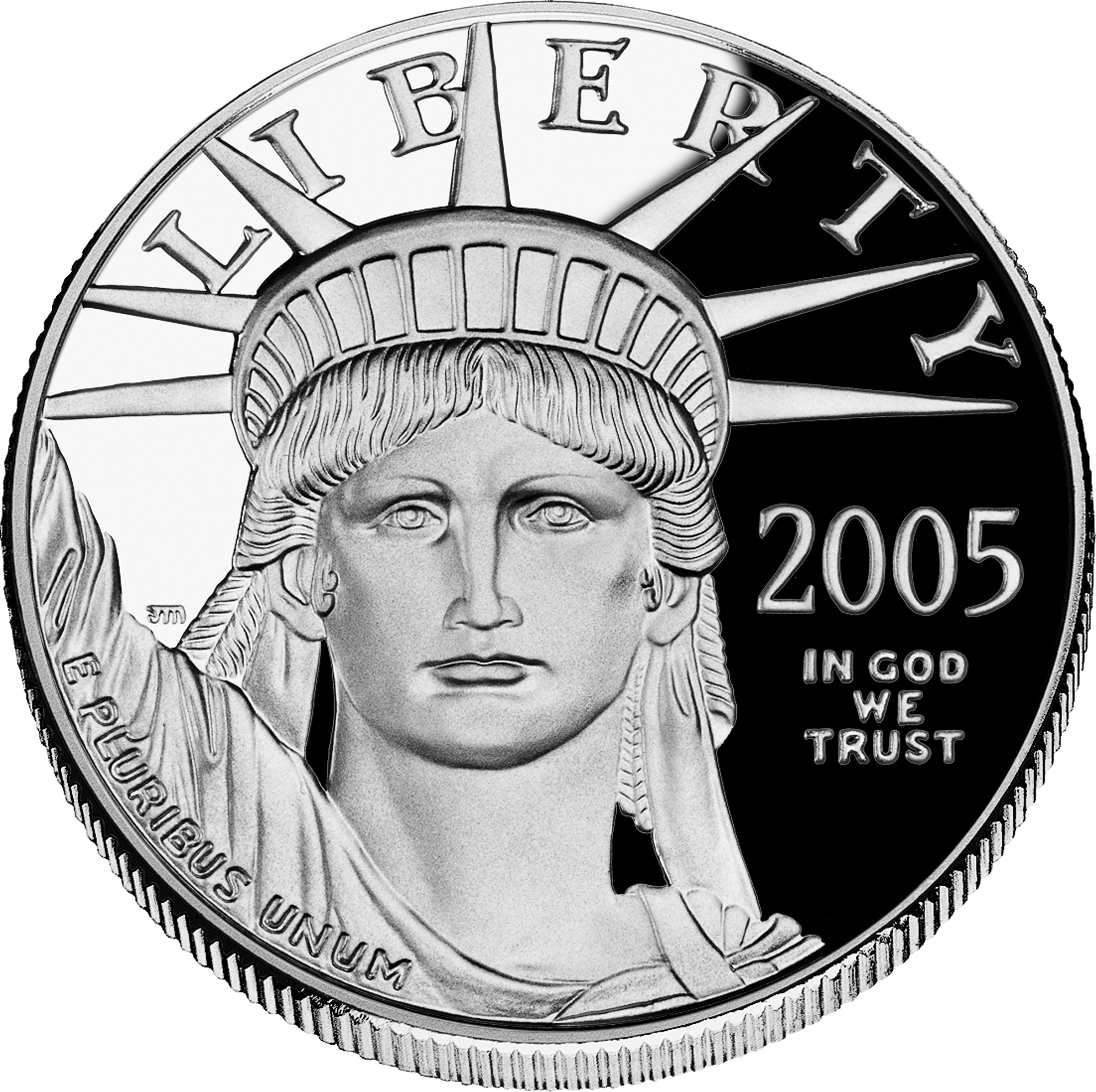
Common obverse of American Platinum Eagle coins, a platinum commemorative United States coin that has been issued in denominations of up to $100 under the authority of 31 U.S.C. Section 5112.

The issuance of paper currency is subject to various accounting and quantity restrictions that platinum coinage is not. According to the United States Mint, coinage is accounted for as follows:

Since Fiscal Year (FY) 1996, the Mint has operated under the United States Mint Public Enterprise Fund (PEF). As authorized by Public Law 104-52 (codified at 31 U.S.C. § 5136), the PEF eliminates the need for appropriations. Proceeds from the sales of circulating coins to the Federal Reserve Banks (FRB), bullion coins to authorized purchasers, and numismatic items to the public and other customers are paid into the PEF and provide the funding for Mint operations. All circulating, bullion and numismatic operating expenses and capital investments incurred for the Mint's operations and programs are paid out of the PEF. By law, all funds in the PEF are available without fiscal year limitation. Revenues determined to be in excess of the amount required by the PEF are transferred to the United States Treasury General Fund as off-budget and on-budget receipts. Off-budget receipts consist of seigniorage, the difference between the receipts from the Federal Reserve System from the sale of circulating coins at face value and the full costs of minting and distributing circulating coins. Seigniorage is deposited periodically to the General Fund where it reduces the government's need to borrow.

The concept of striking a trillion-dollar coin that would generate one trillion dollars in seigniorage, which would be off-budget, or numismatic profit, which would be on-budget, and be transferred to the Treasury, is based on the authority granted by Section 31 U.S.C. § 5112 of the United States Code for the Treasury Department to "mint and issue platinum bullion coins" in any denominations the Secretary of the Treasury may choose. Thus, if the Treasury were to mint one-trillion dollar coins, it could deposit such coins at the Federal Reserve's Treasury account instead of issuing new debt.

31 U.S.C. 5112(k) as originally enacted by Public Law 104-208 in 1996:

The Secretary may mint and issue bullion and proof platinum coins in accordance with such specifications, designs, varieties, quantities, denominations, and inscriptions as the Secretary, in the Secretary's discretion, may prescribe from time to time.

In 2000, the word "bullion" was replaced with "platinum bullion coins". According to the United States Mint: "A bullion coin is an investment-grade coin that is valued by its weight and fineness of a specific precious metal."

Platinum bullion coins can, by this statute, be minted in any denomination, whereas coins in any other specified metal are restricted to amounts of $50, $25, $10, $5 and $1. The concept of minting a very high denomination coin relies on the platinum clause as a loophole for the executive branch to raise revenues without congressional oversight.

Philip N. Diehl, former director of the United States Mint and with Republican Congressman Michael Castle co-author of the platinum coin law, has said the procedure would be permitted by the statute. Castle says he never intended such a use. The platinum coinage provision was eventually passed by a Republican Congress over the objections of a Democratic Treasury in 1996.

Laurence Tribe, a constitutional law professor at Harvard Law School, said the legal basis of the trillion-dollar coin is sound and that the coin could not be challenged in court as no one would have standing to do so.

== Emergence of the concept ==
The idea for the Treasury Department to mint a coin and send it to the Federal Reserve to pay off the debt was first popularized by Populist Party presidential candidate Bo Gritz in 1992. As a standard part of his stump speeches, he would hold up a five-inch example coin. The specific concept was first introduced by Carlos Mucha, a lawyer who commented under the name "beowulf" on various blogs. "Beowulf" outlined the idea in a series of comments on Warren Mosler's blog in May 2010, noting that "Congress has already delegated to Tsy [Treasury] all the seigniorage power authority it needs to mint a $1 trillion coin". Beowulf also drew attention to the concept on the blog of economist Brad Delong in July 2010 and in a legal analysis blogpost of his own in January 2011, but it was not until July 2011 that the use of the concept as an unorthodox method of resolving the debt-ceiling crisis came to the attention of the financial press and mainstream media blogs. At that time, the idea found some support from legal academics such as Yale Law School's Jack Balkin. Once the debt ceiling crisis of the summer of 2011 was resolved, attention to the concept faded.

The concept gained renewed and more mainstream attention by late 2012, as the debt-ceiling limit was being approached again. In early January, the economist Paul Krugman endorsed the idea and asserted that opposition to the idea was coming from people unwilling to admit the truth that "money is a social contrivance". His endorsement attracted considerable media attention. Former Mint director Diehl was widely cited in the media debunking criticisms of the coin and its basis in law. Congressman Jerry Nadler endorsed the idea, and it was featured in the international press by January 4, 2013.

"Beowulf" would later tell Wired magazine that the coin idea came from a December 2009 Wall Street Journal article that talked about how several people generated frequent-flyer miles at no cost by ordering coins from the U.S. Mint with a credit card offering mileage rewards, then depositing the coins at a bank to pay off the credit card debt. He also said that he was inspired by the 2008 book Web of Debt by Ellen Brown, which cited a former Washington official who said the government could order the minting of large coins to pay off the national debt. "Beowulf" said the trillion-dollar coin idea is more rightly attributed to a small discussion group than to an individual, adding that the group was "just in it for the lulz" (i.e., for personal amusement).

== Analysis and reaction ==
Some commentators have argued that although the concept may be strictly legal, it would weaken the checks and balances system of U.S. government, even if the spending that the coin would allow was already authorized by Congress. Opinion columnist Megan McArdle wrote that "minting a $1 trillion coin neatly end-runs GOP obstructionists, but only by proving that the president himself has little respect for the institutional restraints on his office." Felix Salmon, another journalist, wrote that the concept "would effectively mark the demise of the three-branch system of government, by allowing the executive branch to simply steamroller the rights and privileges of the legislative branch." Salmon said that he does not agree with what Congressional Republicans are doing, but that they have a right to do that, and that the president should not use the trillion-dollar coin option to circumvent them. He said, "Yes, the legislature is behaving like a bunch of utter morons if they think that driving the US government into default is a good idea. But it's their right to behave like a bunch of utter morons."

On the other hand, many economists and business analysts endorsed the coin as a way to counter threats by congressional Republicans to force the country into default by refusing to raise the debt limit. Paul Krugman said (in 2013), "So minting the coin would be undignified, but so what? At the same time, it would be economically harmless – and would both avoid catastrophic economic developments and help head off government by blackmail." He also declared the trillion-dollar coin debate to be "the most important fiscal policy debate of our lifetimes".

Michael Steel, spokesperson of House Speaker John Boehner, dismissed the concept by comparing it to a Simpsons episode called "The Trouble with Trillions", which aired 13 years before the 2011 United States debt-ceiling crisis, in which Homer Simpson is on a mission in search of a missing trillion-dollar bill.

On January 7, 2013, Republican congressman Greg Walden announced he would introduce a bill to close the platinum coin loophole. Rep. Walden said that the intention is to "take the proposal off the table." New York representative Jerry Nadler opposed the bill and said that the idea remains a valid option.

On January 12, 2013, the Treasury and Federal Reserve announced they would not mint a platinum coin, and five days later, Senate Minority Whip John Cornyn (R-Texas) announced that Senate Republicans would end their threat to block an increase in the debt ceiling.

In January 2023, Treasury Secretary Janet Yellen said that minting a trillion dollar coin was not on the table as a solution to the 2023 United States debt-ceiling crisis and possible U.S. default on its debt, because the Federal Reserve would be unlikely to accept it, calling it "a gimmick". In May 2023, Paul Krugman commented: "As for claims that [Fed Chair Jerome] Powell would refuse to accept the coin, or the Supremes would block premium bonds — well, nobody knows. But my guess is that nobody wants to be the guy who destroys the world economy." Premium bonds have been touted as a possible alternative to the trillion dollar coin, and an alternative to congressional action raising the debt limit.

In April 2023, Bloomberg News reported that a poll of 1,212 people was conducted in March 2023 to gauge the support for the U.S. Treasury minting the $1 trillion platinum coin to pay off the country's debt obligations. The poll results showed that 14% supported the coin's minting, 37% opposed it, while 49% have no opinion or were undecided.

== Inflation risks ==
The Federal Reserve's purchase of the trillion-dollar coin would be analogous to the securities purchases that are part of quantitative easing (QE), in both cases adding to the monetary base, which is the sum of currency in circulation and bank reserves, i.e. the liabilities of the Federal Reserve. Commercial bank reserves would increase as the Treasury spent the proceeds from the coin's purchase by the Federal Reserve. This would generate the accounting change at the Federal Reserve of moving funds from the Treasury's deposits at the Federal Reserve to commercial banks' deposits at the Federal Reserve ("bank reserves"), a transfer from one Federal Reserve liability category to another. This is no different than the normal process by which checks from the Treasury clear in the banking system. While in principle the increase in the amount of available reserves would expand the banks ability to lend by increasing the headroom under the then statutory reserve requirement and potentially lead to inflation by the mean of further expanding the money supply, that if too rapid could cause the economy to overheat and in turn further raise expectations of future inflation, in fact at that time banks already held excess reserves so any such impact would have likely been limited to the effects of decreased commercial interest rates (developing under the conditions of the increased capacity to lend) and the effects to which the deposits thus created became actuated (i.e. the already expanded money supply became utilized). This was not fully appreciated at the time. For example, Jaret Seiberg of the Washington Research Group stated, "the $1 trillion coin would expand the money supply by a considerable amount, which could spark serious inflation... this economic chaos could worsen the economic downturn, which would further weaken credit conditions and impose higher losses on banks"”

In April 2011, a paper published by the St Louis Federal Reserve Bank said, "some believe QE will sharply increase inflation rates; however, these fears are not consistent with economic theory and empirical evidence – assuming the Federal Reserve is both willing and able to reverse QE as the recovery gains momentum." The paper added that "if the public trusts that the increase in the monetary base QE creates is only temporary, then they will not expect rapid inflation in the near future. These expectations collectively influence actual pricing behavior and, in turn, actual inflation." The Federal Reserve could ensure that commercial banks do not lend out excess reserves by paying interest on their reserves at the Fed, so that the return commercial banks receive on them is greater than they could receive from alternative uses. Finally, in the case of the coin, the Federal Reserve could also sterilize the government's spending of the coin by selling other assets from its balance sheet on a dollar-for-dollar basis, in which case the effect on the monetary base should net to zero. If the debt ceiling were lifted, the Treasury could use borrowing to buy the coin back from the Federal Reserve and return it to the Mint to be melted.

=== Independence of the Federal Reserve ===
Although the Federal Reserve had already indicated on December 12, 2012, that it wished to expand its balance sheet by another $1.02 trillion throughout 2013 via its ongoing purchases of U.S. Treasuries and government-sponsored mortgage-backed securities, Greg Ip has argued that if the Fed's balance sheet were expanded for ostensibly fiscal policy reasons instead of monetary policy reasons, that could constitute an imposition on the independence of the central bank. Ip suggested that any such imposition could be avoided if the additional trillion in coinage were issued directly to the public (in more useful smaller denominations) instead of deposited with the Fed. In May 2010, there was $40.4 billion in coin in circulation and about another $900 billion in banknotes.

Former U.S. Mint Director Edmund C. Moy voiced doubts to TheStreet.com about whether the Federal Reserve could buy the coin, noting also that under the current system for initiating orders for coinage, the order might have to be placed by the current Fed Chair, or by one of the 12 Presidents of the regional Federal Reserve Banks. Former Director Diehl disagreed with Moy concerning a platinum bullion coin but agreed with Moy that a platinum coin would be a problem for the Fed. Diehl reiterated his view that "I certainly think [minting a trillion-dollar coin] is inferior to raising or eliminating the [debt] limit, but it's far better than defaulting and suffering the consequences of doing so."

== See also ==
- Money
