= 1814 platinum half dollar =

19th-century American pattern coin

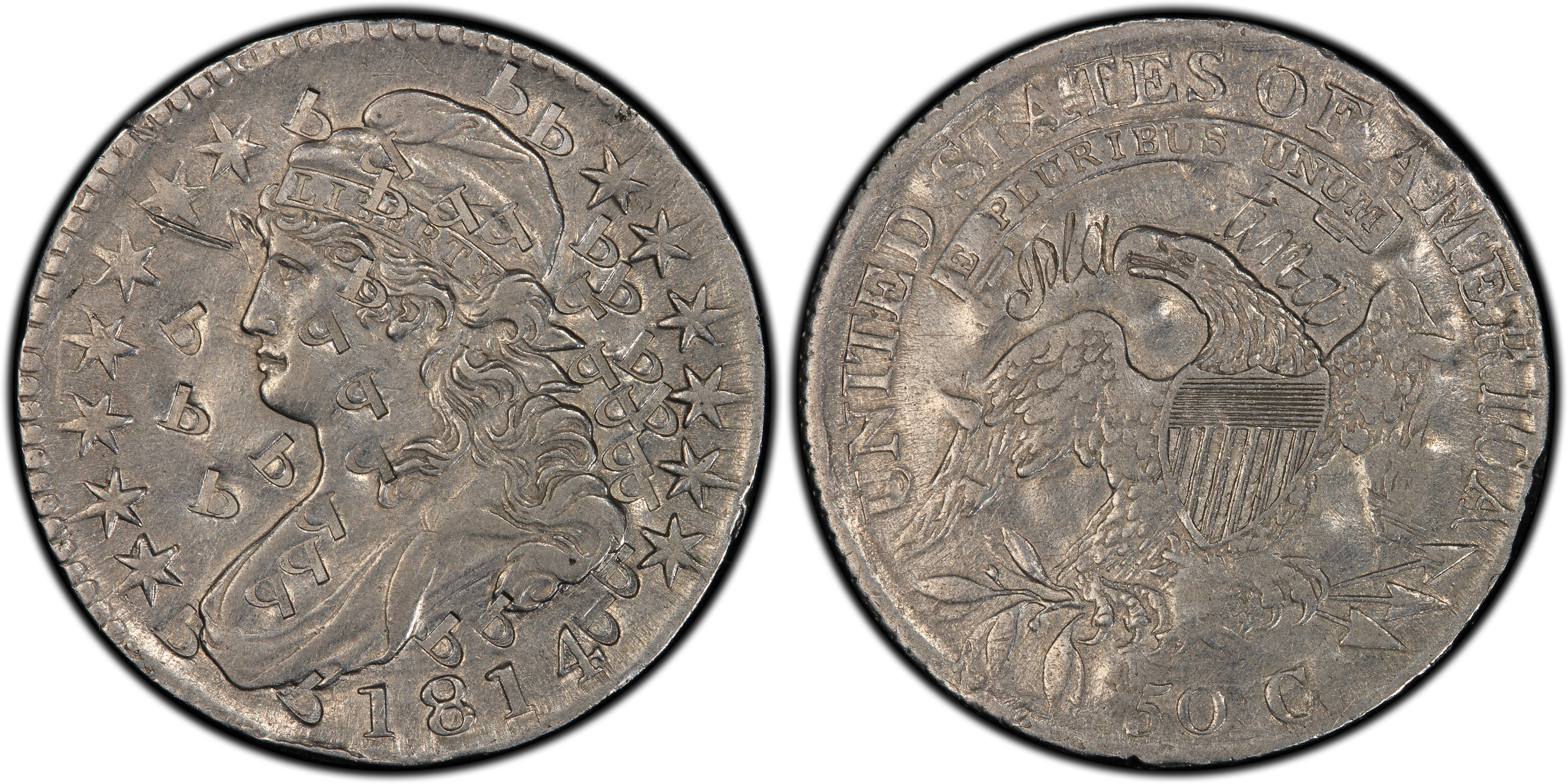
The only known example of the counterstamped 1814 platinum half dollar, J-44a

The 1814 platinum half dollar (J-44) was a United States pattern coin with a face value of fifty cents. Its design was identical to the Capped Bust half dollar, but struck in platinum.

A unique example with 33 "P" punch marks has been given the catalog number J-44a. It has been described as "one of the most intriguing - and mysterious - pattern coins ever produced by the United States." There are two examples known without the punch marks.

== See also ==
- Platinum coin
