= American Platinum Eagle =

Platinum bullion coin of the United States

Platinum Eagle
- United States
- Value: 10–100 U.S. dollars (face value); see denominations
- Edge: Reeded
- Composition: 99.95% Pt
- Years of minting: 1997–2008, 2014, 2016–present (bullion); 1997–present (proof); 2006–2008 (uncirculated)

Obverse
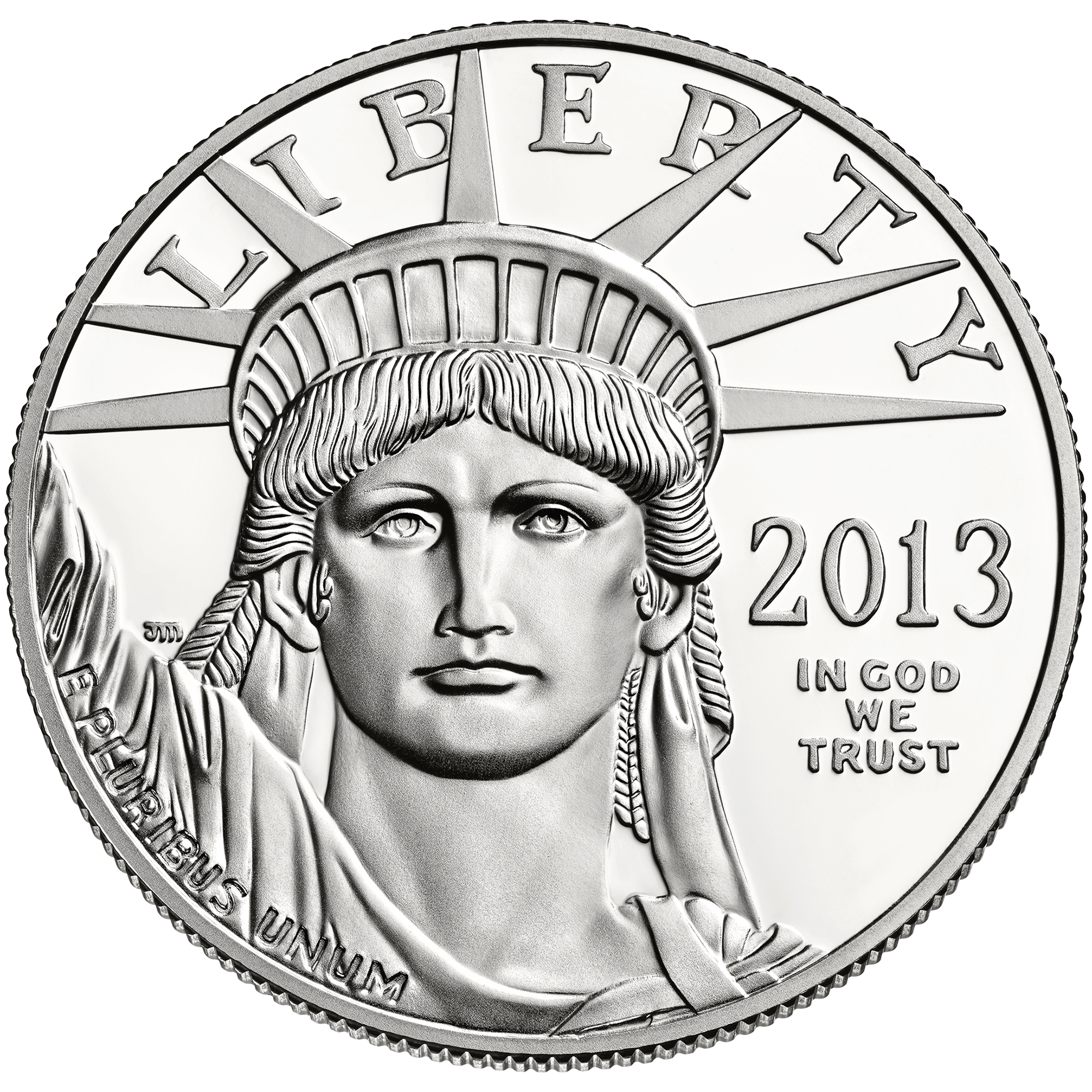
- Bullion (1997–present), Proof (1997–2017)
- Design: "Liberty Looking to the Future"
- Designer: John Mercanti
- Design date: 1997

Reverse
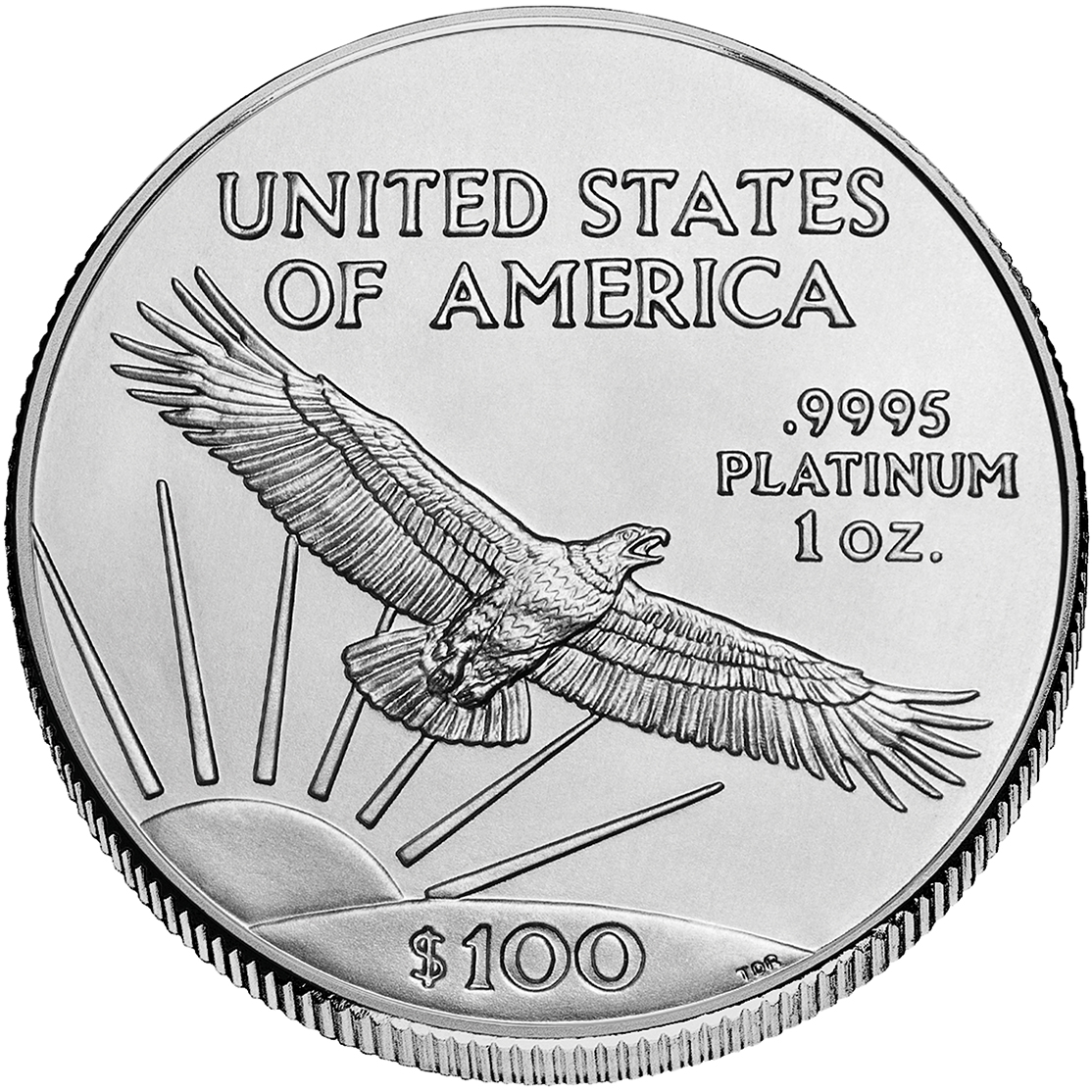
- Bullion (1997–present), Proof (2017)
- Design: "Soaring Eagle over America"
- Designer: Thomas D. Rogers
- Design date: 1997
- Proof (2018–present)
- Design: Flying eagle with olive branch
- Designer: Patricia Lucas-Morris
- Design date: 2018

The American Platinum Eagle is the official platinum bullion coin of the United States. In 1995, Director of the United States Mint Philip N. Diehl, American Numismatic Association President David L. Ganz, and Platinum Guild International Executive Director Jacques Luben began the legislative process of creating the Platinum Eagle. After over two years of work, the 99.95% fine platinum coins were released by the United States Mint in 1/10, 1/4, 1/2 and 1 troy oz denominations. In late 2008, the fractional denominations were discontinued, leaving only the one ounce denomination. The Platinum Eagle is authorized by the United States Congress, and is backed by the United States Mint for weight, content, and purity. Its obverse was designed by John Mercanti, and portrays the Statue of Liberty (Liberty Enlightening the World) by Frédéric Auguste Bartholdi.

Proof versions of the coins are intended for coin collectors and sold directly to the public whereas the bullion versions are sold only to the Mint's authorized buyers. The proof American Platinum Eagles are unique in the fact that they are the only U.S. bullion coins that have a yearly alternating design. Bullion versions are minted with the same design every year. While minted, the uncirculated Platinum Eagles matched the proof designs and were struck on burnished coin blanks with a "W" mint mark signifying West Point, further distinguishing them from the bullion versions.

== Denominations ==
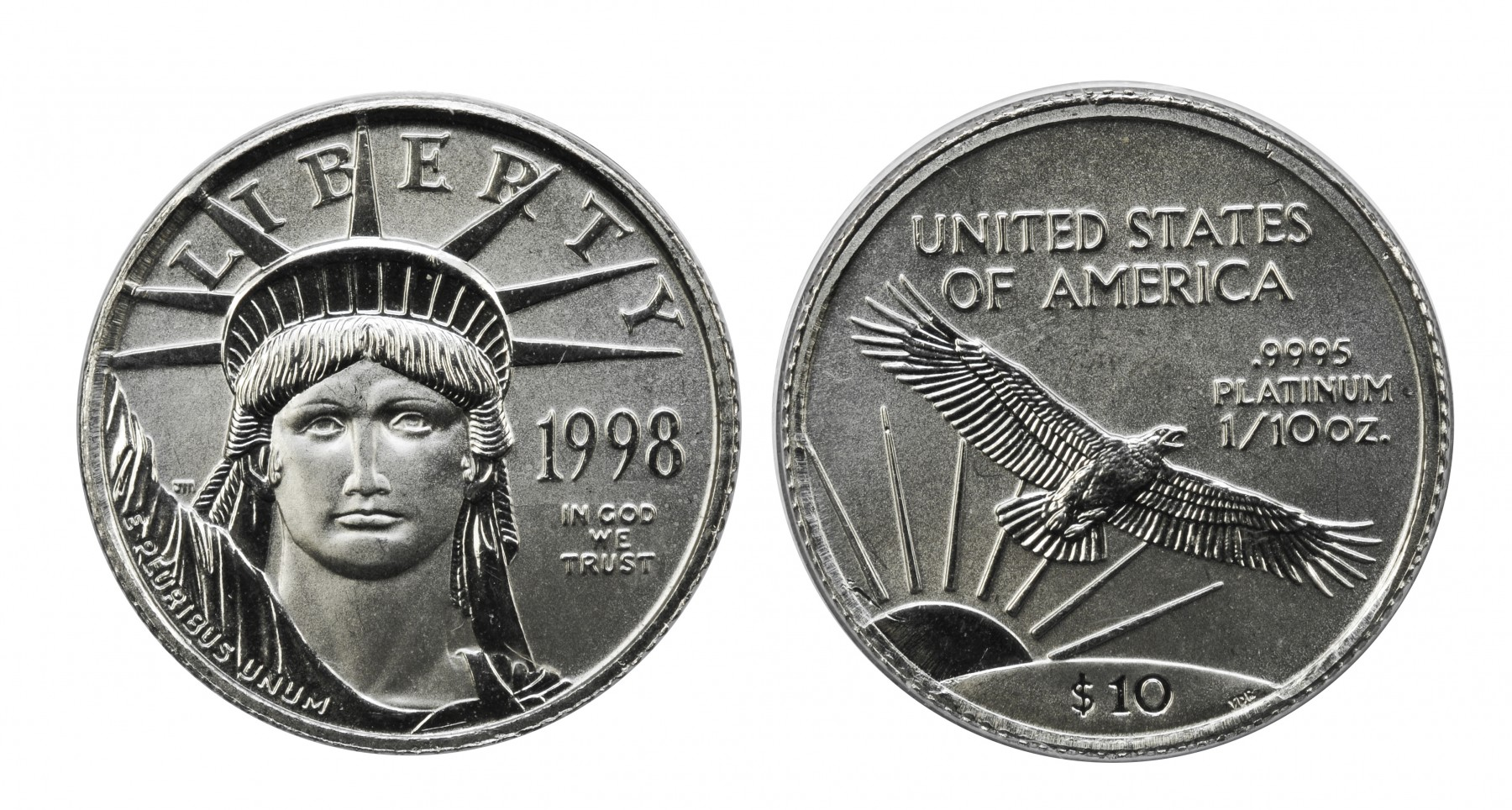
A 1/10 troy oz. bullion strike bears the .9995 PLATINUM 1/10 OZ. inscription.

The 1/10, 1/4, and 1/2 troy oz coins are identical in design to the 1 troy oz coin except for the markings on the reverse side that indicate the weight and face value of the coin (for example, .9995 PLATINUM 1 OZ.). As is often the case with bullion coins, the face values of these coins ($10, $25, $50, and $100) are their legal values reflecting their issue and monetized value as coins. They are legal tender for all debts public and private at their face values. The 1 troy oz coin's face value of $100 is the highest to ever appear on a U.S. coin.

The specifications of each denomination are presented below:

| Denomination | Diameter | Thickness | Weight |
|---|---|---|---|
| $10 (1/10 troy oz) | 16.5 mm (0.65 in) | 0.95 mm (0.037 in) | 0.1001 ozt (3.11 g) |
| $25 (1/4 troy oz) | 22.0 mm (0.87 in) | 1.32 mm (0.052 in) | 0.2501 ozt (7.78 g) |
| $50 (1/2 troy oz) | 27.0 mm (1.06 in) | 1.75 mm (0.069 in) | 0.5003 ozt (15.56 g) |
| $100 (1 troy oz) | 32.7 mm (1.29 in) | 2.39 mm (0.094 in) | 1.0005 ozt (31.12 g) |

== Value ==
The intrinsic values of the coins are much greater than their face values. In one notable case, this was involved in a money laundering and tax evasion case where defendant Robert Kahre paid employees a wage in bullion coins with a fair intrinsic value but a very low face value, then proceeded to use the low face values to claim zero tax withholdings, allegedly defrauding a total of $120 million.

== Yearly designs ==
All denominations of the proof American Platinum Eagles carry a yearly design. Since 1998, each design aside from the 2017 reverse commemorating the 20th anniversary of the program, has been part of a themed series:

- 1998–2002: The Vistas of Liberty series featured reverse designs depicting a bald eagle in a different landscape of the United States, in a different region of the country.
- 2006–2008: The Foundations of Democracy series featured reverse designs representing the three branches of government.
- 2009–2014: The Preamble to the Constitution series explored the core concepts of American democracy by highlighting the Preamble to the United States Constitution. The themes for the reverse designs for this program are inspired by narratives prepared by Chief Justice of the United States, John Roberts, at the request of the United States Mint.
- 2015–2016: The Torches of Liberty series featured reverse designs from the Artistic Infusion Program which represent the "nation's core values of liberty and freedom".
- 2018–2020: The Preamble to the Declaration of Independence series features obverse designs portraying Lady Liberty and handwritten single-word inscriptions from the Declaration of Independence in addition to a new common reverse design. It is the first series to vary obverse designs, all created concurrently by the same designer, rather than reverse designs.
- 2021–2025: The First Amendment to the United States Constitution series highlights five freedoms enshrined in the First Amendment.

| Year | Design | Description | Designer & Sculptor |
|---|---|---|---|
| 1997 | Click to enlarge image | Soaring Eagle Above America | Thomas D. Rogers |
| 1998 | Click to enlarge image | Bald eagle flying over New England and rocky beach town with light house; full moon in sky | Thomas D. Rogers |
| 1999 | Click to enlarge image | Bald eagle flying above Southeastern Wetlands and alligator crawling in a swamp | Al Maletsky |
| 2000 | Click to enlarge image | Bald eagle flying above Midwestern field, barn and house | Al Maletsky |
| 2001 | Click to enlarge image | Bald eagle flying above giant Saguaro cacti of the Southwest (specifically Arizona) | Thomas D. Rogers |
| 2002 | Click to enlarge image | Swooping bald eagle and a lake bordered by snowcapped mountains and trees in the Northwestern US | Al Maletsky |
| 2003 | Click to enlarge image | Bald eagle perched on a Rocky Mountain pine branch against a backdrop of the United States Flag | Al Maletsky |
| 2004 | Click to enlarge image | Engraving inspired by the Daniel Chester French sculpture titled America outside the U.S. Customs House in New York City. | Donna Weaver |
| 2005 | Click to enlarge image | American bald eagle perched on a heraldic shield with symbols representing America's strength and beauty | Donna Weaver |
| 2006 | | "Legislative Muse" flanked by two eagles perched on columns representing the bicameral legislature of the United States Congress | Designer: Joel Iskowitz; Sculptor: Don Everhart |
| 2007 | | American bald eagle representing the Executive Branch | Designer: Tom Cleveland; Sculptor: Phebe Hemphill |
| 2008 | | "Lady Justice" watched over by an American bald eagle representing the Judicial Branch | Designer: Joel Iskowitz; Sculptor: Charles Vickers |
| 2009 | | To Form a More Perfect Union "Four faces representing the diversity of our Nation, with the clothing and hair weaving together symbolizing the principle" | Designer: Susan Gamble; Sculptor: Phebe Hemphill |
| 2010 | | To Establish Justice "A blindfolded justice–symbolizing impartiality–holding traditional scales and carrying a branch of laurel" | Designer: Donna Weaver; Sculptor: Phebe Hemphill |
| 2011 | | To Insure Domestic Tranquility "Harvest goddess emerging from a field of wheat, symbolizing the vastness of our Nation and its wide diversity of views. She bears a a [sic] stalk of wheat in her left hand, as she extends her right hand to a landing dove, representing the fulfillment of tranquility in our Nation's cohesive yet free society" | Designer: Joel Iskowitz; Sculptor: Phebe Hemphill |
| 2012 | Click to enlarge image | To Provide for the Common Defence "A vigilant minuteman from the Revolutionary War, representing the protection and defense of the country during its early days. The minuteman carries a rifle and a book, which symbolizes the importance of knowledge in defending our Nation" | Designer: Barbara Fox; Sculptor: Charles L. Vickers |
| 2013 | | To Promote General Welfare "Young America against a backdrop of interlocking gears, symbolizing the interconnection of power between the states and the national government" | Designer: Joel Iskowitz |
| 2014 | | To Secure the Blessings of Liberty to Ourselves and our Posterity "Young Lady Liberty carrying her torch, symbolizing the hope and promise of America" | Designer: Susan Gamble; Sculptor: Joseph Menna |
| 2015 | | Liberty Nurtures Freedom "Liberty and an American bald eagle, representing Freedom. The earth and sun with rays are in the foreground" | Designer: Joel Iskowitz; Sculptor: Phebe Hemphill |
| 2016 | | "Liberty holding a torch of enlightenment in her right hand and an olive branch in her left to symbolize peace. The olives represent the Thirteen Original Colonies. A bald eagle with its wings outstretched appears beside Liberty" | Designer: Paul C. Balan; Sculptor: Joseph Menna |
| 2017 | 1997 Design, reused in 2017 | Soaring Eagle Above America 20th Anniversary Commemorative | Thomas D. Rogers |
| 2018 | | Life "Lady Liberty planting seeds for future sustenance, lighting the way westward, and harvesting the well-worked crops" | Designer: Justin Kunz; Sculptor: Phebe Hemphill |
| 2019 | | Liberty "Lady Liberty keeping watch over prairies, lakes, and mountains as pioneers head westward" | Designer: Justin Kunz; Sculptor: Joseph Menna |
| 2020 | | Pursuit of Happiness "Lady Liberty plants seeds for future sustenance, lighting the way westward, and harvesting the well-worked crops." | |
| 2021 | | Freedom of Religion "The obverse (heads) design depicts a seedling and an acorn surrounded by the inscription WITH FREEDOM OF RELIGION LIBERTY GROWS." | |
| 2022 | | Freedom of Speech "The obverse (heads) design features a juvenile oak tree framed with the inscription WITH FREEDOM OF SPEECH LIBERTY BLOSSOMS." | |
| 2023 | | Freedom of the Press "The obverse (heads) design portrays the branch of mature oak tree with acorns amidst the inscription WITH FREEDOM OF THE PRESS LIBERTY BEARS FRUIT." | |
| 2024 | | Right to Assemble "The obverse (heads) design showcases several types of oak leaves assembled between the inscription WITH THE RIGHT TO ASSEMBLE LIBERTY SPREADS." | |
| 2025 | | Right to Petition "The obverse (heads) design features a mature, spreading, impressive oak tree between the inscription WITH THE RIGHT TO PETITION LIBERTY ENDURES. The oak, known for its strength, can live up to 200 years and is a symbol of endurance." | |

== Tenth anniversary set ==
On November 28, 2007, the U.S. Mint announced the American Eagle 10th Anniversary Platinum Coin Set. Intended to commemorate the 10th anniversary of the Platinum Eagle's 1997 launch, the set contained two half-ounce ($50) Platinum Eagles, one matching the 2007 proof strike from earlier in the year and the other carrying an enhanced reverse proof finish with the same design. This first offering of a reverse proof version of the Platinum Eagle followed the prior year's release of similar sets for the American Silver Eagle and American Gold Eagle's 20th anniversary. In addition to being accompanied by a certificate of authenticity, the coins were encased in a domed mahogany box designed to display the coins at an angle.

The set's release on December 13, 2007, at a price of $1,949.95 (around $475 above platinum spot) with a seven-day one-set-per-household limit was met with strong collector interest. First week sales reached 14,682 units, almost half of the maximum ordered mintage of 30,000 units. However, due to fluctuations in the price of platinum, the Mint suspended sales on February 13, 2008, and resumed sales about a month later at $2,649.95. Initially, the increased price constituted a larger premium, around $635, above spot. The following months brought a decline in platinum's price below $1,000 per troy oz, precipitating further suspensions and a final price of $1,249.95. When sales were officially ended on December 31, 2008, over a year after its initial release, the Mint reported total sales of 19,583 units.

== Mintage figures ==
The figures listed below are the final audited mintages from the U.S. Mint and include coins sold both individually and as part of multi-coin sets. Since 2009, only the $100 (1 troy oz) denomination has been offered.

=== Bullion ===
Bullion Platinum Eagles were not issued from 2009 to 2013. Similarly, in 2015, due to an insufficient quantity of blanks, no bullion Platinum Eagles were issued.

| Year | $10 – 1/10 oz. | $25 – 1/4 oz. | $50 – 1/2 oz. | $100 – 1 oz. |
|---|---|---|---|---|
| 1997 | 70,250 | 27,100 | 20,500 | 56,000 |
| 1998 | 39,525 | 38,887 | 32,419 | 133,002 |
| 1999 | 55,955 | 39,734 | 32,309 | 56,707 |
| 2000 | 34,027 | 20,054 | 18,892 | 10,003 |
| 2001 | 52,017 | 21,815 | 12,815 | 14,070 |
| 2002 | 23,005 | 27,405 | 24,005 | 11,502 |
| 2003 | 22,007 | 25,207 | 17,409 | 8,007 |
| 2004 | 15,010 | 18,010 | 13,236 | 7,009 |
| 2005 | 14,013 | 12,013 | 9,013 | 6,310 |
| 2006 | 11,001 | 12,001 | 9,602 | 6,000 |
| 2007 | 13,003 | 8,402 | 7,001 | 7,202 |
| 2008 | 17,000 | 22,800 | 14,000 | 21,800 |
| 2014 | - | - | - | 16,900 |
| 2016 | - | - | - | 20,000 |
| 2017 | - | - | - | 20,000 |
| 2018 | - | - | - | 30,000 |
| 2019 | - | - | - | 40,000 |
| 2020 | - | - | - | 56,500 |
| 2021 | - | - | - | 75,000 |

=== Proof ===
| Year | $10 – 1/10 oz. | $25 – 1/4 oz. | $50 – 1/2 oz. | $100 – 1 oz. |
|---|---|---|---|---|
| 1997-W | 36,993 | 18,628 | 15,431 | 20,851 |
| 1998-W | 19,847 | 14,873 | 13,836 | 14,912 |
| 1999-W | 19,133 | 13,507 | 11,103 | 12,363 |
| 2000-W | 15,651 | 11,995 | 11,049 | 12,453 |
| 2001-W | 12,174 | 8,847 | 8,254 | 8,969 |
| 2002-W | 12,365 | 9,282 | 8,772 | 9,834 |
| 2003-W | 9,534 | 7,044 | 7,131 | 8,246 |
| 2004-W | 7,161 | 5,193 | 5,063 | 6,007 |
| 2005-W | 8,104 | 6,592 | 5,942 | 6,602 |
| 2006-W | 10,205 | 7,813 | 7,649 | 9,152 |
| 2007-W | 8,176 | 6,017 | 25,519 | 8,363 |
| 2008-W | 5,138 | 4,153 | 4,020 | 4,769 |
| 2009-W | - | - | - | 7,945 |
| 2010-W | - | - | - | 9,871 |
| 2011-W | - | - | - | 14,790 |
| 2012-W | - | - | - | 9,081 |
| 2013-W | - | - | - | 5,763 |
| 2014-W | - | - | - | 4,596 |
| 2015-W | - | - | - | 3,886 |
| 2016-W | - | - | - | 9,151 |
| 2017-W | - | - | - | 8,892 |
| 2018-W | - | - | - | 13,724 |
| 2019-W | - | - | - | 9,869 |

=== Uncirculated (burnished) ===
| Year | $10 – 1/10 oz. | $25 – 1/4 oz. | $50 – 1/2 oz. | $100 – 1 oz. |
|---|---|---|---|---|
| 2006-W | 3,544 | 2,676 | 2,577 | 3,068 |
| 2007-W | 5,556 | 3,690 | 3,635 | 4,177 |
| 2008-W | 3,706 | 2,481 | 2,253 | 2,876 |

== See also ==
- American Gold Eagle
- American Silver Eagle
- American Palladium Eagle
- Canadian Platinum Maple Leaf
- Eagle (U.S. coin)
- Inflation hedge
- Platinum coin
- Platinum as an investment
- Trillion-dollar coin
