= Chinese Gold Panda =

Chinese gold bullion coin

Gold Panda
- People's Republic of China
- Edge: Reeded
- Composition: 99.9% fine gold (Au)
- Years of minting: 1982–present

Obverse
- Design: Temple of Heaven
- Design date: 1982

Reverse
- Design: Different illustrations of giant pandas.
- Design date: Yearly

The Chinese Gold Panda (simplified Chinese: 熊猫金币; traditional Chinese: 熊貓金幣; pinyin: xióng māo jīn bì) is a series of gold bullion coins issued by the People's Republic of China. The Official Mint of the People's Republic of China introduced the panda gold bullion coins in 1982. The panda design changes every year (with a single exception) and the Gold Panda coins come in different sizes and denominations, ranging from 1/20 to 1 troy ounce (1.6 to 31.1 grams) (and larger ones as well).

There is also a Silver Panda series issued with the same designs as the Gold Panda coins.

== History ==
China issued its first gold coins picturing a panda design in 1982, in sizes of 1, 1/2, 1/4, and 1/10 ozt (31.1, 15.6, 7.8, and 3.1 g) of 99.9 fine gold. Beginning in 1983 another size was added – 1/20 ozt (1.6 g). Larger panda coins were issued in some years, weighing 5 and 12 ozt (160 and 370 g). These popular coins are issued in prooflike brilliant uncirculated quality with a different design each year. A freeze of the design was announced with the 2001 issues—and thus the 2002 pandas were identical to 2001. But collectors spoke up in behalf of annual changes, and China reverted to their original policy. There are several mints that produce these coins, including but not limited to: Beijing, Shanghai, Shenyang and Shenzhen. Unlike coins made by U.S. branch mints that carry mintmarks to identify their origin, Chinese mints usually do not employ them. In certain years there are minor variations—in the size of the date, style of the temple, etc.—in the coin design that allow the originating mint to be determined. Certain years are also designed by different designers. The design of the obverse changes less frequently than the design of the panda side. The official Chinese panda coins should not be confused with Chinese medals that also use a panda.

== Description ==
Obverse: Depiction of the Temple of Heaven in the center with Chinese characters on top saying "Zhonghua Renmin Gongheguo" meaning People's Republic of China and the bottom the year of issue. If the issue is a commemorative issue, the theme will be marked here also.

Reverse: Different portraits of panda that changes every year (except for 2001 and 2002, which share the same design).

The official distributor for the Gold and Silver Panda coins in China is the China Gold Coin Corporation (CGCC); in the United States, Panda America has been an official distributor since 1982.

== Denominations ==
The Gold Pandas are legal tender in the People's Republic of China and are currently issued in face value denominations of 500, 200, 100, 50 and 20 yuan; from 1982 through 2000 they were issued in denominations of 100, 50, 25, and 10 yuan with the 5 yuan added in 1983. Through 2015, these corresponded with 1, 1/2, 1/4, and 1/10 ozt (31.1, 15.6, 7.8, and 3.1 g) of gold, respectively. An exception was 1991, when 1-gram Gold Pandas were minted, issued in the denomination of 3 yuan. 2015 was the only year that the Gold Panda did not have any denomination imprinted on the coin.

Face value (1982-2000)	Face value (2001-2015)	Nominal gold weight	Fine weight	Total weight	Diameter	Thickness
100 yuan	500 yuan	1 troy ounce		31.103 g	32.05 mm	2.70 mm
50 yuan	200 yuan	1/2 troy ounce		15.5515 g	27.00 mm	1.85 mm
25 yuan	100 yuan	1/4 troy ounce		7.7758 g	21.95 mm	1.53 mm
10 yuan	50 yuan	1/10 troy ounce		3.1103 g	17.95 mm	1.05 mm
5 yuan	20 yuan	1/20 troy ounce		1.5552 g	13.92 mm	0.83 mm

=== Revised weights ===
Starting in 2016, the weight system of troy ounces was replaced by the metric system of grams, the standard system of weights used in the People's Republic of China. This change may affect bullion buyers, who calculate their holdings in ounces, more than coin collectors who collect by denomination.

Face value	Nominal gold weight	Fine weight	Total weight	Diameter	Thickness
500 yuan	0.9645 troy ounce		30 g	32 mm	2.70 mm
200 yuan	0.4823 troy ounce		15 g	27 mm	1.85 mm
100 yuan	0.2572 troy ounce		8 g	22 mm	1.53 mm
50 yuan	0.0965 troy ounce		3 g	18 mm	1.05 mm
10 yuan	0.0322 troy ounce		1 g	10 mm	0.83 mm

== See also ==
- American Gold Eagle
- Bullion
- Bullion coin
- Gold as an investment
- Inflation hedge
- Platinum as an investment
- Silver as an investment

== Additional reading ==
- Krause, Chester L.; Clifford Mishler (2004). 2005 Standard Catalog of World Coins: 1901–Present (32nd ed.). Krause Publications. ISBN 0873497945.
