= 2023 United States debt-ceiling crisis =

On January 19, 2023, the United States hit its debt ceiling, leading to a debt-ceiling crisis, part of an ongoing political debate within Congress about federal government spending and the national debt that the U.S. government accrues. In response, U.S. treasury secretary Janet Yellen began enacting temporary "extraordinary measures". On May 1, 2023, Yellen warned these measures could be exhausted as early as June 1, 2023; this date was later pushed to June 5.

The debt ceiling had been increased multiple times through December 2021 since the 2013 debt-ceiling standoff, each time without budgetary preconditions attached. In the 2023 impasse, Republicans proposed cutting spending back to 2022 levels as a precondition to raising the debt ceiling, while Democrats insisted on a "clean bill" without preconditions, as had been the case in raising the ceiling 3 times during the first Donald Trump administration.

If the government had run out of funds, the Treasury would have had to either default on payments to bondholders or immediately curtail payment of funds owed to various companies and individuals that had been mandated but not fully funded by Congress. Both situations had been expected to result in a global economic meltdown. Additionally, if the federal government had been unable to issue new debt, it would have had to balance its budget by imposing budget cuts that, in total, would have equaled 5% of the size of the American economy. Constitutional scholar Laurence Tribe said that a default would be unconstitutional due to the 14th Amendment and the government would be required to repay its debts despite hitting the debt ceiling. President Joe Biden said that he was considering invoking the 14th Amendment because he felt he had authority to do so, but questioned whether it could be done in time to avoid default given the possibility that it might be appealed.

On May 27, Biden and then-House speaker Kevin McCarthy struck a deal to increase the debt-ceiling but cap federal spending; the resulting bill, the Fiscal Responsibility Act of 2023, passed the House on May 31 and the Senate on June 1. Biden signed it into law on June 3, bringing the crisis to an end.

== Background ==
=== The deficit and the national debt ===
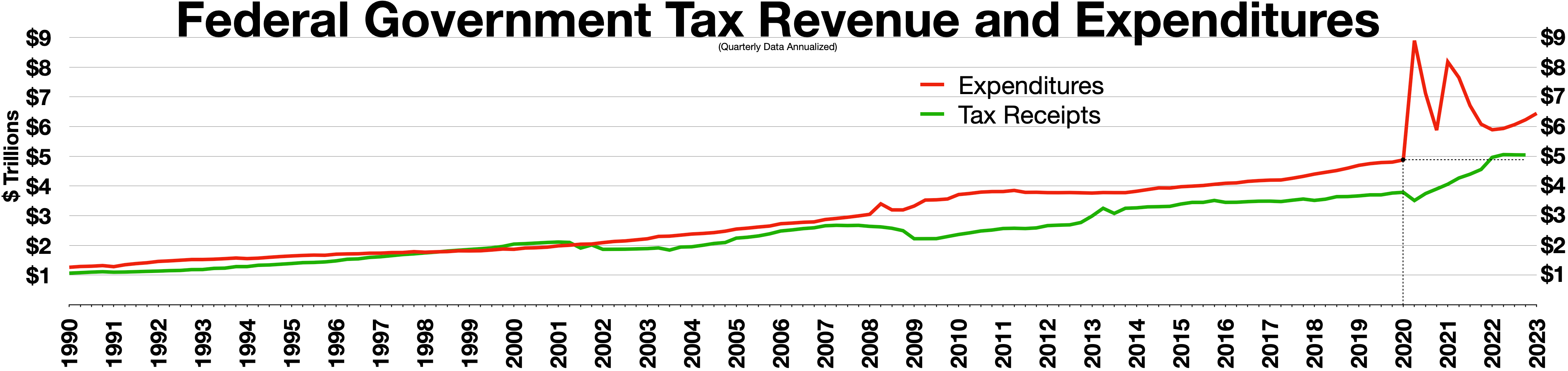
Federal government tax revenue and expenditures. Reducing spending to pre-pandemic levels would balance the budget. Federal government expenditures Federal government tax receipts Pre-pandemic spending levels comparison

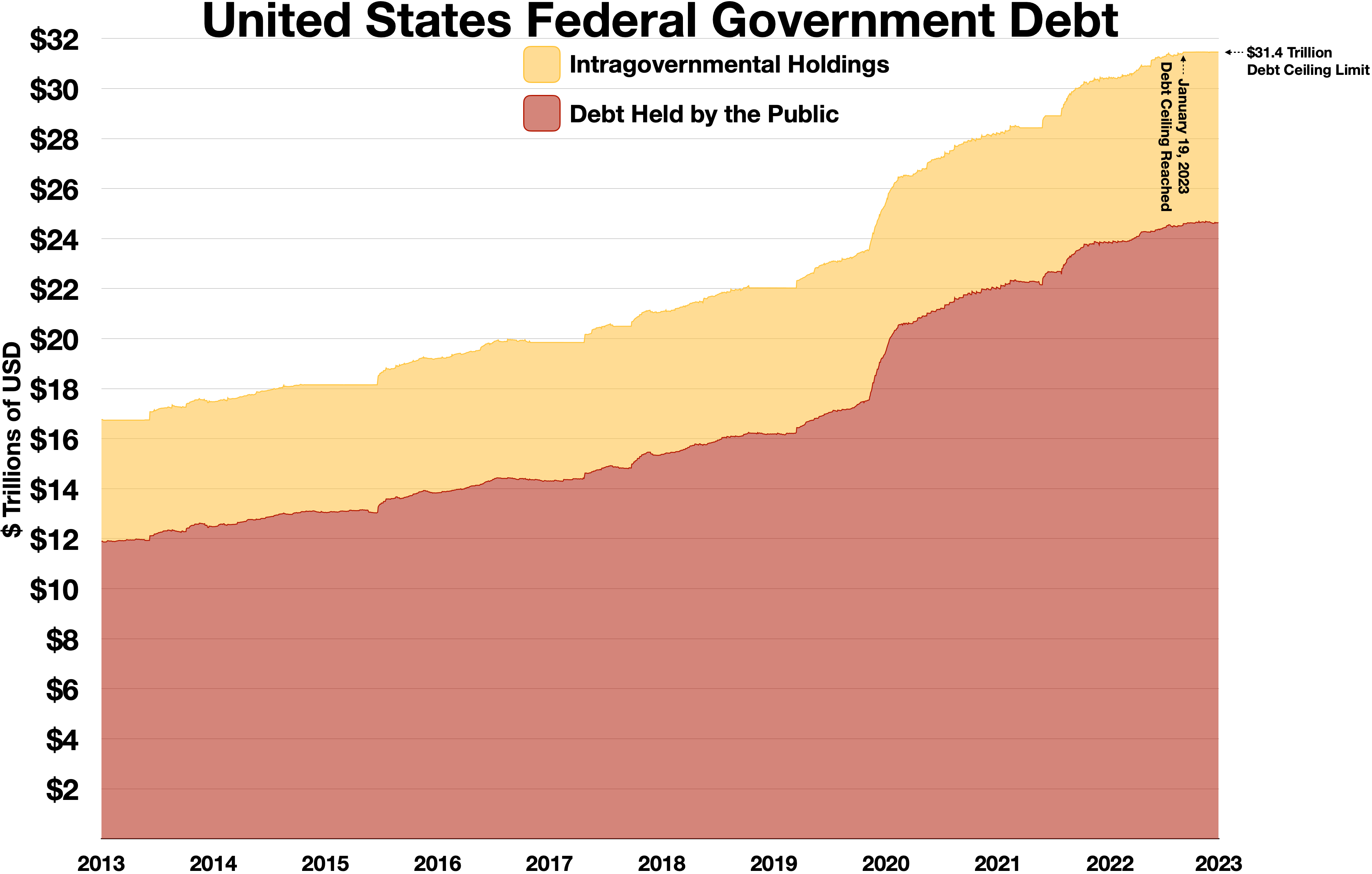
Federal government debt Intragovernmental holdings Debt held by the public

==== Federal budget and deficit ====
In 2019, just over 60% of the federal budget went to mandatory spending for programs like Social Security, Medicare, and Medicaid, with another 30% going to discretionary spending (half of which went to defense). The remaining 9% went to pay for interest on the debt. Meanwhile, both mandatory spending programs and interest on the debt were expected to take up increasing shares of the federal budget, while tax revenues were expected to be stagnant.

In the fiscal year 2022, the federal government brought in $4.90 trillion but spent $6.27 trillion, with a net budget deficit of $1.38 trillion (the fourth-highest of the 21st century). In addition, it has run deficits every year since 2001, when it last ran a surplus. Financing a deficit requires that the government borrow money.

However, based on Article 1, Section 8, Clause 2 of the United States Constitution, only Congress has the authority to borrow money "on the Credit of the United States".

==== Debt ceiling ====
The United States debt ceiling is a legislative limit that determines how much debt the Treasury Department may incur. It was introduced in 1917, when Congress voted to give Treasury the right to issue bonds for financing America participating in World War I, rather than issuing them for individual projects, as had been the case in the past. In 1939, Congress gave the treasury the right to issue and manage debt—though it limited how much it could issue. From 1939 to 2018, the treasury increased the debt ceiling 98 times, decreasing it five times. Whilst the treasury can borrow money to pay for federal expenditures, it is limited in power by Congress.

In other words, the treasury can borrow money to pay for federal expenditures—but only as much as Congress lets it.

==== National debt ====
Since 2009, America's national debt has nearly tripled, with annual federal deficits averaging close to $1 trillion since 2001. During the 21st century, it has gone up for various reasons, including tax cuts under presidents Bush and Trump, wars in Iraq and Afghanistan, entitlements like Medicare Part D, and spending in response to the Great Recession and the COVID-19 pandemic. Currently, the U.S. is the industrialized country with the fourth highest debt-to-GDP ratio, behind Japan, Italy and Greece. Additionally, the national debt is forecast to be double the United States' GDP by 2051.

==== Reducing the deficit and debt ====
According to both policy experts and politicians, dealing with the deficit and debt will ultimately involve both raising taxes and decreasing spending. Past plans for taxes hikes have included reducing the number of deductions, increasing rates on higher earners, and making new taxes, while proposals for reducing spending have included reducing Social Security benefits, lowering payments for Medicaid and Medicare, and cutting defense spending, among others.

However, it tends to be difficult to do so in practice, owing to citizens' reluctance to alter large programs like Social Security or the raising of taxes. Historically, no political party has been willing to reduce the deficit or debt when they have held power, although the issue is often a foundation of candidates' election campaigns.

=== The U.S. dollar and borrowing ===
The United States dollar (used heavily in international trade) is considered to be the world's reserve currency for a variety of reasons including the sheer magnitude of the American economy, America's geopolitical strength, the dollar's relative stability, and the market for U.S. debt.

As well, the Compromise of 1790 (when Treasury Secretary Alexander Hamilton got both Secretary of State Thomas Jefferson and Representative James Madison to agree to take on Revolutionary War debts assumed by the states and the Continental Congress in exchange for locating the capital on the Potomac River by Virginia) played a role with this: Because Revolutionary War bondholders were paid 100 cents on the dollar, America made good on its debt and established good credit. This, in turn, helped contribute to the dollar becoming the world's reserve currency.

As a result, foreign creditors (including China, Japan, and the United Kingdom) are large markets for the currency. This makes it easier for the U.S. government to finance the national debt via being charged lower interest rates for borrowing money.

== Reactions ==
=== Congress and the president ===
The House of Representatives and the White House disagreed on how to resolve this crisis. Former House speaker Kevin McCarthy (R-CA) called for negotiations to reduce federal spending in exchange for increasing the debt ceiling, including making possible cuts to Medicare, Medicaid, and Social Security, or otherwise possibly overhauling entitlements. In contrast, the Biden administration declared that raising the debt ceiling is non-negotiable, and that Congress is obligated to increase it. Senate minority leader Mitch McConnell (R-KY) had said that there will be no default, though he also said that dealing with the debt ceiling would be up to President Biden and Speaker McCarthy.

As well, members of the House Freedom Caucus (and a few other Republicans who were not part of it, such as Representative Matt Gaetz) had raised a significant portion of funding for their 2022 election campaigns from small donors, which made it easier for them to resist pressure from business groups to raise the debt ceiling. Indeed, the debt ceiling fight was viewed by some as being an example of widening divisions between corporate America and the Republican Party, which had begun during the Trump presidency. On May 5, 2023, the president's senior advisor, Mitch Landrieu, appeared on TV to field questions on the White House response to the debt-ceiling crisis and the banking crisis. A week later, Landrieu held a press conference at the White House to underscore the serious threat to the national economy of the 'manufactured crisis' of the debt-ceiling standoff.

=== Treasury Department ===
==== Secretary Yellen's comments ====
Treasury Secretary Janet Yellen told the Associated Press that, while she expected that Congress would eventually raise the debt ceiling, demanding spending cuts in exchange for doing so would be irresponsible and that increasing it was about ensuring that the federal government could pay for spending that Congress had already approved, rather than about new spending. Yellen made similar points in her January 13, 2023, letter to Congress, also warning that if they did not suspend or raise it, they would harm the American economy, the American people, and the global financial system's stability.

==== "Extraordinary measures" ====
As a result of reaching the debt ceiling, the Treasury Department began considering implementation of "extraordinary measures" to prevent a default for a few months, so as to give Congress time to increase the debt ceiling, explained in a memo it issued on January 19, 2023. However, it would only be able to use them for a few months. Extraordinary measures are accounting maneuvers that the Treasury uses to enable the federal government to continue to meet its various financial obligations while there is an impasse over the debt ceiling. Said measures were first used by it in 1985, and Congress granted the Treasury permission to continue using them the following year.

Secretary Yellen also initiated a "debt issuance suspension period" through June 5, and has rejected the minting of a trillion-dollar coin (which would have created $1 trillion in seigniorage).

=== Markets ===
Analysts were monitoring the ongoing debate over raising the debt ceiling, and were keeping investors informed of it and similarly warning about the potential consequences of a default. However, as of January 23, 2023, markets were not reacting to the debt ceiling debate, as the expectation was that the debt ceiling would be raised in time to prevent default. Analysts wrote that, with the exception of the 2011 debt ceiling crisis, markets had historically not reacted to debates over raising it. On the other hand, they wrote that if the debt ceiling wasn't increased as the deadline for doing so drew nearer, stock prices would start dropping and interest rates would begin to rise.

On May 5, 2023, European credit rating agency Scope placed the United States' AA sovereign rating under review for downgrade.

== Responses and analysis ==
=== Comparisons to the 2011 debt ceiling crisis ===
The Associated Press has noted similarities between the 2023 debt ceiling crisis and the one in 2011, including how both involved the GOP-controlled House of Representatives demanding spending cuts in exchange for increasing the debt limit.

In 2011, both the House and the Obama administration negotiated for months on it until talks collapsed. As a result, markets experienced turmoil, with the S&P 500 dropping by over 16% in the final month before the deadline. In August 2011, two days before the government would have defaulted, there was a compromise between Democrats and Senate Republicans to create a committee to look into cutting spending, and to also increase the debt ceiling. As a result of the near-default, America's credit rating was downgraded to AA+ by Standard and Poor's, as American borrowing costs went up by $1.3 billion that year.

=== Potential consequences of a default ===
Increasing political polarization since 2011 has made votes to raise the debt ceiling more contentious than before, with economists now considering what would happen if the federal government defaulted on its loans. One analysis from September 2021 (during a previous debt limit standoff) said that, if the federal government defaulted, America's credit rating would experience a drastic downgrade, interest rates on Treasury bonds would go up sharply, interest rates both in the U.S. and worldwide would spike, and payments on benefits (such as social security) and salaries for the military would be stopped. Other potential consequences of a default would include reduced consumer confidence, a recession, immediately stopping about 10% of the American economy, increasing the cost of a 30-year mortgage, losing three million jobs in the U.S., and increasing the national debt due to higher interest rates.

Moody's Analytics warned that Congress may not be able to avoid breaching the debt limit. This warning was based on both the difficulty the House had in electing Kevin McCarthy as Speaker, and how some lawmakers (mostly Republican) were wondering if the Treasury would be able to prioritize paying bondholders if it was breached.

=== Fundraising off of the debt ceiling fight ===
Even with the ongoing fight over raising the debt ceiling, party leaders in Congress were busy raising money, with Republican Congressional leaders raising about $10.4 million and Democratic ones raising $5.7 million during the first three months of 2023.

A number of moderate and progressive Democrats in the House and Senate had explicitly brought up the current debt ceiling fight in fundraising appeals to their supporters, and had framed it in terms of warning about potential consequences of a default. Messages about this came from Senate majority leader Chuck Schumer, moderates like senators Jon Tester and Sherrod Brown, and progressives like Representative Alexandria Ocasio-Cortez and Senator Elizabeth Warren.

Meanwhile, Republican senator Tim Scott explicitly brought up the debt ceiling fight in his fundraising emails, though he wrote about it in terms of limiting government spending. At the same time, far Right Republicans in Congress had been using the debt ceiling over the past few years to galvanize their supporters and to do fundraising based on it.

=== Possible scenarios for how the impasse would end ===
In March 2023, economists with Moody's Analytics analyzed five different scenarios for dealing with the debt limit. They included the following in their report on this:

- Increasing it right before x-date without any conditions (possibly by suspending it until October 1, and then increasing it again to last until sometime in early 2025), thereby avoiding damage to the economy. This would also be what they had done on previous occasions when there was debate over increasing the debt ceiling, and which report indicated would be the most likely possibility for resolving it this time.
- Unilateral action by the executive branch to avert default, which could include:
1. President Biden invoking the 14th Amendment (Section 4) in case no agreement had been made by x-date to increase the debt ceiling. Though it would avert default, it could cause a constitutional crisis and the Supreme Court could have to intervene.
2. The Treasury minting a trillion-dollar coin with its authority under 31 U.S.C. Section 5112, depositing it at the Federal Reserve, and drawing it down to pay the government's bills.
3. The Treasury issuing premium bonds rather than par bonds as Treasury debt comes due, lowering the face amount of debt outstanding and subject to the debt limit.
- The Treasury prioritizing payments for a few days, which would cause interest rates to spike, would cause chaos in the markets, and would increase the odds of a mild recession starting in late 2023. As well, it is unknown if the Treasury Department would be legally allowed to do this, or if it would be able to, plus effects on the United States' credit rating are unknown.
- Adopting ideas the House Republicans were suggesting in March 2023, including cutting both Medicaid and nondefense-related discretionary spending. Results of this would include a recession and reduced economic growth for the next decade (the borrowing would be significantly reduced, so interest rates would be lower), with people with lower incomes being more likely to suffer financially due to losing both government benefits and jobs.
- A lengthy default that would last for weeks. Results of this would include Treasury debt being downgraded by credit rating agencies, reduced treasury spending, a severe recession, higher interest rates, and a long-term diminution of the U.S. dollar's status as the world's reserve currency, among other effects.

== Potential debt ceiling workarounds ==
=== Fourteenth Amendment ===
While the Fourteenth Amendment, ratified in 1866, is more widely known for its provisions granting citizenship to freed slaves and establishing equal rights, it also contains a long-forgotten provision, Section 4, that states, in part, "The validity of the public debt of the United States, authorized by law, including debts incurred for payment of pensions and bounties for services in suppressing insurrection or rebellion, shall not be questioned." With former Confederate states being admitted back into the Union at the time of the 14th amendment's ratification, many pro-Union members of Congress feared that if the South were to take back a significant amount of Congress, or were to retake the Presidency, they would refuse to pay the debt incurred by the Union during the Civil War, or pay debts incurred by the Confederacy to support its war effort against the United States. Section 4 confirmed the legitimacy of all U.S. debt to stop this from ever happening.

While Section 4's original purpose has long become moot, many constitutional legal scholars believe that Section 4 of the 14th amendment makes the debt ceiling unconstitutional. President Biden could, in theory, end the crisis by avoiding Congress altogether, issuing an executive order invoking Section 4 and ordering the Treasury to continue making payments, even if that pushed the public debt above $31.4 trillion.

However, an invocation of the 14th amendment by President Biden would come with serious pitfalls. Legal scholars are divided as to whether or not it would be legally permissible for Biden to take such an action. His executive order might not be accepted by the courts, and even if it were eventually upheld by the United States Supreme Court, the uncertainty leading up to a decision might cause turmoil in the markets and a spike in interest rates.

=== Trillion-dollar coin ===
In 1997, Congress passed a law that vested power to the Treasury to mint commemorative platinum coins of any denomination. The law, 31 U.S.C. Section 5112, was originally intended to help the Treasury make money off of coin collectors, an idea penned by Delaware's at-large representative, Republican Mike Castle. The text of the statute did not specify any limitations on how high the denomination of the coin could be.

An idea, which first emerged just prior to the 2011 debt ceiling crisis, is that the treasury secretary could instruct the US Mint to issue a trillion-dollar coin, and deposit it with the Federal Reserve.

According to economist Mark Zandi, using the coin in such a way would be inflationary. An opinion article in National Review likened it to the government "printing money" to pay off debt. However, according to economist Paul Krugman, the move would not be inflationary, saying on Twitter, "The Fed would surely sterilize any impact on the monetary base by selling off some of its huge portfolio of US debt."

Contemporary treasury secretary Janet Yellen dismissed the plan as a "gimmick", saying that the Federal Reserve isn't required to accept the coin for deposit, and likely would not. Krugman expressed a different opinion, saying on Twitter, "As for claims that Powell would refuse to accept the coin, or the Supremes would block premium bonds — well, nobody knows. But my guess is that nobody wants to be the guy who destroys the world economy. Even people happy to see it burn don't want their fingerprints on it."

== Attempts to raise the debt ceiling ==
Having recently regained control of the House, Republicans demanded deep spending cuts as a precondition to raising the debt ceiling, while Democrats insisted on a "clean bill" without preconditions, as had been the case in raising the ceiling in 2017, 2018, and 2019, during the Trump administration.

=== Meetings between Biden and McCarthy ===
==== February ====
On Wednesday, February 1, 2023, President Biden and Speaker McCarthy met for an hour in the Oval Office to discuss how to raise the debt ceiling. The two did not reach agreement – the president called for a clean debt ceiling increase, while the speaker demanded cuts to spending in exchange for raising it – though both agreed they would continue talking about it.

==== May ====
Biden and McCarthy met several times in May to try and find a way to solve the crisis, ultimately coming to an agreement on May 27.

=== March 9 presidential budget ===
On March 9, 2023, President Biden released a potential budget for 2023. At 184 pages, this budget included $3 trillion to reduce the deficit, with savings largely coming from increased taxes on the wealthy and corporations.

=== Limit, Save, Grow Act ===
Limit, Save, Grow Act
- Long title: To provide for a responsible increase to the debt ceiling, and for other purposes.
- Announced in: the 118th United States Congress
- Number of co-sponsors: 19

Legislative history
- Introduced in the House of Representatives as H.R. 2811 by Jodey Arrington (R–TX) on April 25, 2023; Committee consideration by the House Committee on Ways and Means; Passed the House of Representatives on April 26, 2023 (217–215)

On April 19, Speaker McCarthy unveiled the Limit, Save, Grow Act, a 320-page House bill which would have raised the debt ceiling by $1.5 trillion (enough to last until at least March 31, 2024) while at the same time providing for significant spending cuts. More specifically, the proposals contained in the draft law included halting the partial federal student loan forgiveness program put in place by the Biden administration, introducing work requirements for Medicaid, withdrawing IRS enforcement funding for audits, and eliminating several clean energy subsidies.

In its April 25 analysis of the bill, the Congressional Budget Office estimated that it would reduce federal budget deficits from 2023 to 2033 by a total of around $4.8 trillion, with two-thirds of that coming from reduced discretionary outlays and the rest coming from lower mandatory spending, increased revenue, and lower interest payments on the national debt.

Responses to the bill were mixed. House Budget Committee chairman Jodey Arrington, who filed the bill, criticized the Biden administration's spending while saying that the plan would address that. Meanwhile, the House Budget Committee's Democratic members referred to it as "The Default on America Act", or DOA for short. President Biden said on April 25 that, had the bill passed Congress, he would have vetoed it.

It was originally reported that a considerable amount of Republican Representatives would not have supported the bill. However, on April 26, following several days of negotiations and last-minute changes to the bill, the latter managed to pass in the House of Representatives by a vote of 217 to 215, with Republicans Andy Biggs of Arizona, Ken Buck of Colorado, Tim Burchett of Tennessee and Matt Gaetz of Florida joining all Democrats present in voting against it.

The bill was highly unlikely to pass in the Senate. Nonetheless, it was viewed by House Republicans as a stepping stone for further negotiations with President Biden on the debt ceiling and spending cuts.

=== Discharge petition ===
Breaking the Gridlock Act
- Long title: To advance commonsense policy priorities, and for other purposes
- Announced in: the 118th United States Congress
- Number of co-sponsors: 0

Legislative history
- Introduced in the House of Representatives as H.R. 626 by Mark DeSaulnier (D–CA) on January 30, 2023

On May 17, Democratic representative Brendan Boyle introduced a discharge petition to force a vote on House Resolution 350, a special rule providing for immediate consideration of the so-called Breaking the Gridlock Act and of one amendment to the same, to be offered by the most senior ranking minority member of the Committee on Ways and Means. Democrats intended to use the amendment to replace the original text of the draft law in its entirety, turning it into a bill raising the debt ceiling.

By May 27, all 213 Democratic representatives had signed the petition. Nonetheless, the petition failed to obtain the 218 signatures needed for consideration because no Republican signed it.

== Agreement ==
Fiscal Responsibility Act of 2023
- Long title: To provide for a responsible increase to the debt ceiling.
- Enacted by: the 118th United States Congress
- Effective: June 3, 2023

Citations
- Public law: Pub. L. 118–5 (text) (PDF)
- Statutes at Large: 137 Stat. 10

Codification
- Acts affected: Balanced Budget and Emergency Deficit Control Act of 1985; Food and Nutrition Act of 2008; Inflation Reduction Act of 2022; National Environmental Policy Act of 1969

Legislative history
- Introduced in the House as H.R. 3746 by Patrick McHenry (R–NC) on May 29, 2023; Committee consideration by the House Committee on Ways and Means; Passed the House on May 31, 2023 (314–117); Passed the Senate on June 1, 2023 (63–36); Signed into law by President Joe Biden on June 3, 2023

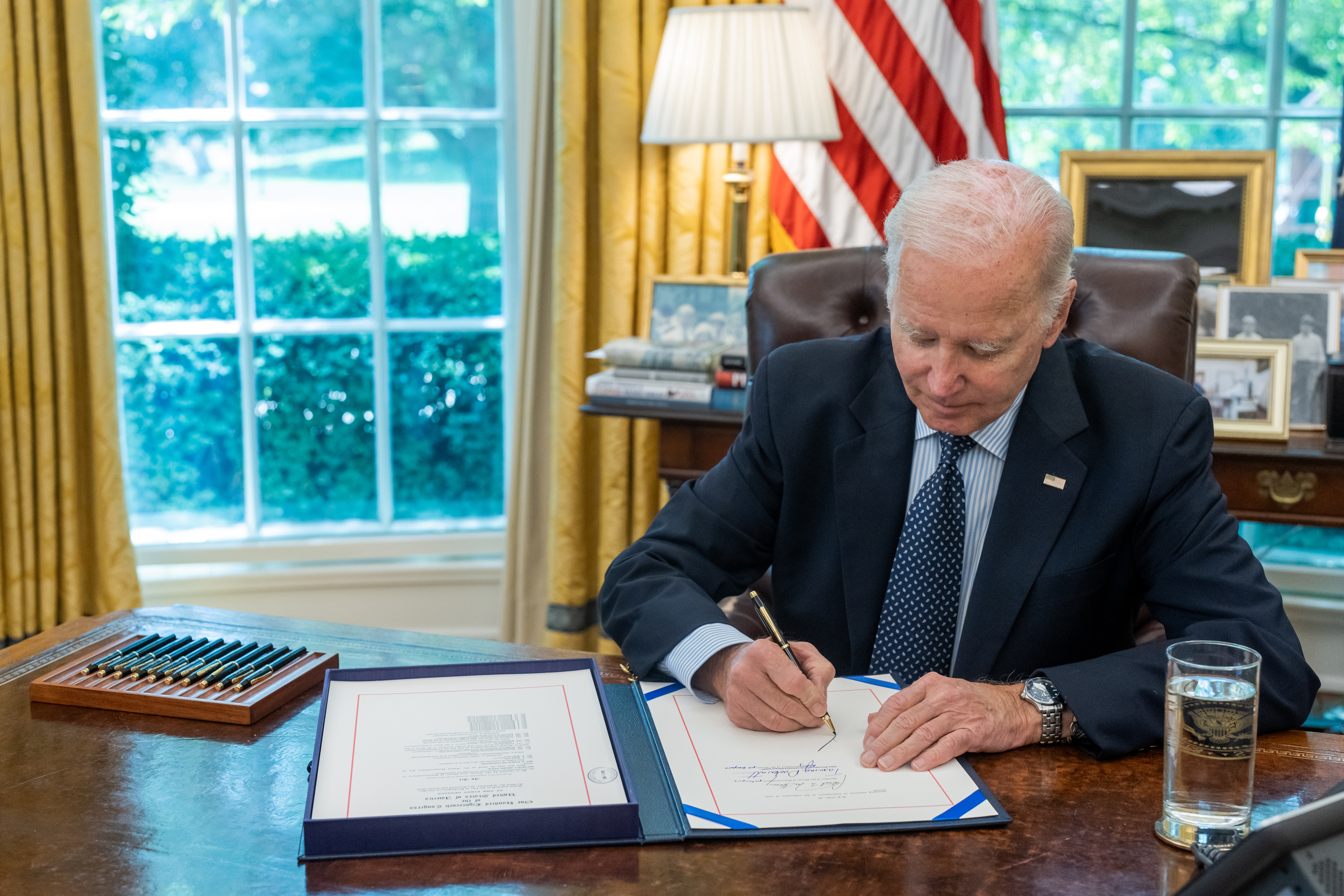
President Biden signing the Fiscal Responsibility Act into law on June 3, 2023

The Fiscal Responsibility Act of 2023 is an act of the 118th United States Congress that suspended the debt limit until January 2025, bringing an end to the crisis. The bipartisan piece of legislation, endorsed by both Republican and Democratic leadership, was introduced by Patrick McHenry on May 29, 2023, to implement the agreement negotiated between Biden and McCarthy. On May 30, the Rules Committee agreed to send the bill to the Floor of the House by a vote of 7 to 6, with Republicans Ralph Norman and Chip Roy joining all Democratic members of the Committee in voting against. It was agreed to by the House on May 31, with a bipartisan coalition having voted 314–117 in favor, while the Senate passed it the following day in a 63–36 vote. It was signed into law by President Biden on June 3.

During the 2023 United States debt-ceiling crisis, McCarthy was forced to negotiate with Democratic President Biden in order to resolve the crisis with a bill that would pass the Democrat-controlled United States Senate and would not be vetoed. Economists said it would be "catastrophic" if the debt ceiling was not raised. The negotiations resulted in the bipartisan Fiscal Responsibility Act of 2023, which capped discretionary spending in 2024 and 2025 and increased work requirements for SNAP recipients. The deal angered members of the House Freedom Caucus who believed that the bill was not conservative enough. Two members of the Freedom Caucus voted with Democrats in an attempt to block the act in the Rules Committee, but failed by one vote.

On May 31, in a procedural rule vote on the house floor, which historically is supported by all members of the majority party and opposed by minority members regardless of their feelings on the underlying bill, 29 conservative Republicans opposed the vote. In order to ensure the bill's passage, Democratic Leader Hakeem Jeffries held up a green card to alert Democrats they could vote in favor of the measure, resulting in 52 Democrats showing their support for the procedural vote. A majority of both the Republican and Democratic parties voted for the Fiscal Responsibility Act of 2023, but more Republicans (71) voted against the bill than Democrats (46).

=== Provisions ===
The Fiscal Responsibility Act includes the following provisions:

- The debt limit is suspended until January 1, 2025.
- Discretionary spending is capped during fiscal years 2024 and 2025.
- All unused funds appropriated during the COVID-19 pandemic are rescinded.
- $1.4 billion of the $80 billion of additional funding for the Internal Revenue Service provided by the Inflation Reduction Act of 2022 is rescinded.
- The administration is required to operate under a PAYGO system in which any executive regulation whose implementation costs more money than it brings in can only be made if an equal or greater amount of money is rescinded from other federal programs; this requirement is waivable by the Office of Management and Budget.
- The student loans payment moratorium enacted in 2020 ends on September 1, 2023; the partial student loan forgiveness plan introduced by the Biden administration remains unaffected.
- Work requirements for adult SNAP recipients with no dependents are broadened so as to apply to all aged under 51 in fiscal year 2023, to all aged under 53 in fiscal year 2024, and to all aged under 55 in fiscal years 2025 to 2030 (prior to the bill's passage, only those under 50 were required to work in order to be eligible). Veterans and homeless people are exempt from this provision.
- Obtaining a federal permit for energy projects is made easier, especially for select long-distance grid transmission projects and the construction of the Mountain Valley Pipeline.

=== Vote summaries ===
==== House of Representatives ====
Democratic yes Democratic no Republican yes Republican no Democratic not voting Republican not voting

===== Committee votes =====
Vote by the Committee on Rules to send the Fiscal Responsibility Act of 2023 to the full House
May 30, 2023	Party		Total votes
May 30, 2023	Democratic	Republican	Total votes
Yes	0	7	7 (53.85%)
No	4	2	6 (46.15%)
Not voting	0	0	0 (0.00%)
Result: Passed

===== Votes by the full House =====
Procedural vote to provide for consideration of the Fiscal Responsibility Act of 2023
May 31, 2023	Party		Total votes
May 31, 2023	Democratic	Republican	Total votes
Yea	52	189	241 (55.40%)
Nay	158	29	187 (42.99%)
Not voting	4	3	7 (1.61%)
Result: Passed

Final vote on the Fiscal Responsibility Act of 2023
May 31, 2023	Party		Total votes
May 31, 2023	Democratic	Republican	Total votes
Yea	165	149	314 (72.18%)
Nay	46	71	117 (26.90%)
Not voting	2	2	4 (0.92%)
Result: Passed

==== Senate ====
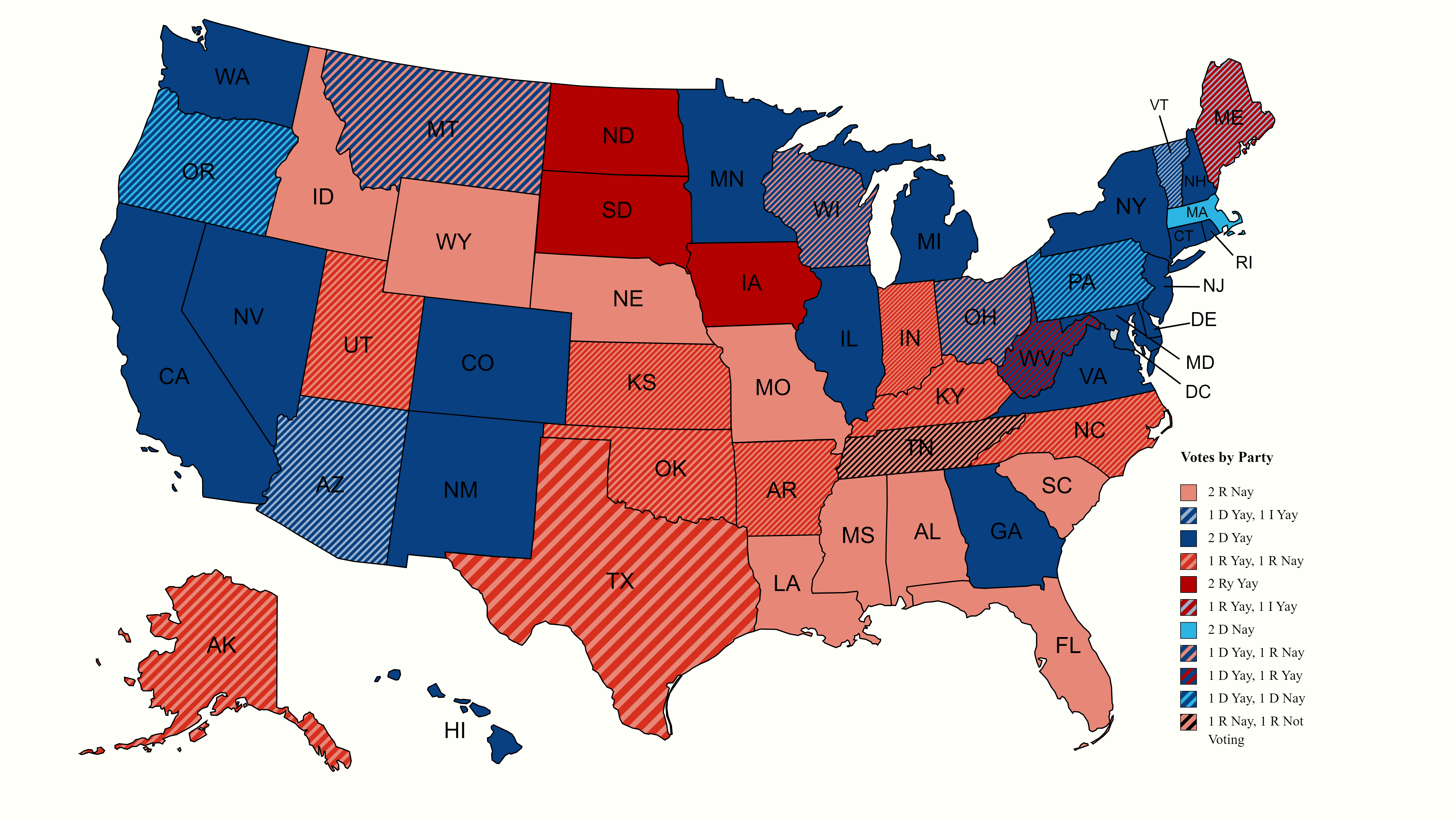
Senate vote (see image for legend)

Final vote on the Fiscal Responsibility Act of 2023
June 1, 2023	Party			Total votes
June 1, 2023	Democratic	Republican	Independent (Note: All three independent senators caucused with the Democrats.)	Total votes
Yea	44	17	2	63 (63.00%)
Nay	4	31	1	36 (36.00%)
Not voting	0	1	0	1 (1.00%)
Result: Passed

== Aftermath ==
The Fiscal Responsibility Act angered some members of the far-right Republican House Freedom Caucus who believed that the bill was not conservative enough. In protest, on June 6, 11 members of the Freedom Caucus voted with Democrats to block a procedural rules vote on a Republican bill that would hinder the federal government's ability to regulate gas stoves. On June 12, 2023, the Freedom Caucus and McCarthy reached an agreement that resulted in the Freedom Caucus not blocking procedural votes in exchange for more conservative legislation being brought to the floor.

== See also ==
- History of the United States debt ceiling
- 1995–1996 United States federal government shutdowns, which included a dispute about the debt ceiling
- 2011 United States debt-ceiling crisis
- 2013 United States debt ceiling crisis
