= Chinese Silver Panda =

Bullion coin from China

Silver Panda
- China
- Value: 10 Yuan (face value)
- Mass: 30 g (.965 troy oz)
- Diameter: 40 mm (1.52 in)
- Thickness: <=3 mm (0.118 in)
- Edge: Reeded slanted left
- Composition: 99.9% Ag
- Years of minting: 1983-present

Obverse
- Design: The Hall of Prayer for Good Harvests located in the Temple of Heaven complex

Reverse
- Design: 2018 version Panda
- Design date: 2017

The Chinese Silver Panda (Chinese: 熊猫银币; pinyin: xióngmāo yínbì) is a series of silver bullion coins issued by the People's Republic of China. The design of the panda is changed every year and minted in different sizes and denominations, ranging from 0.5 troy oz. to 1 kilogram. Starting in 2016, Pandas switched to metric sizes. The 1 troy ounce coin was reduced to 30 grams, while the 5 troy ounce coin was reduced to 150 grams. There is also a Gold Panda series issued featuring the same designs as the Silver Panda coins.

== History ==
The first Silver Panda coins—issued 10 yuan Panda bullion in 1983, 1984 and 1985—were proof quality, with a precious metal content of 27 grams of 0.900 fine silver and a diameter of 38.6 mm. Mintages were only 10,000 for each year. No Silver Pandas were issued in 1986. The 1987 Silver Panda coins were minted in proof quality from 1 troy oz. of sterling (.925 fine) silver, with a diameter of 40 mm. There are several mints that produced Silver Panda coins over the years, including: Shanghai, Shenyang, and Shenzhen. Unlike coins made by US and German mints that carry mintmarks to distinguish their origin, Chinese mints generally do not carry mintmarks. In certain years there are minor variations in the coin design—such as the size of the date, and temple that allows the originating mint to be determined. An example is 1996 where different mints produced coins with minor variations in the font size of the date on the obverse side of the coins. In 2015, the Gold and Silver Panda coins were not labeled with metal fineness and weight. This information returned in 2016 when the 1 troy ounce coin was replaced by the 30-gram coin (one troy ounce is approximately 31.1 grams).

The official distributor in China for the Silver and Gold Panda coins is the China Gold Coin Incorporation (CGCI).

As of 2020, the highest-priced coin is a perfect 1983 proof panda worth $16,430. The highest-priced, non-proof coin is a perfect large-date 1991 panda worth $3,100.

== Specifications ==
Specifications
Weight	Face value	Diameter	Thickness
1 kilogram	300 yuan	100 mm	13 mm
12 troy oz	100 yuan		14 mm
5 troy oz	50 yuan	70 mm	6 mm
150 grams	50 yuan	70 mm	
1 troy ounce	10 yuan	40 mm	
30 grams	10 yuan	40 mm	
1/2 troy oz	5 yuan	33 mm	2.2 mm
1/4 troy oz	3 yuan	25 mm	

=== Thickness ===
Taking the 1-ounce silver coin as an example, the authentic coin has a thickness of only about 2.6 millimeters, while the thickness of the counterfeit coin exceeds 3 millimeters. If they are of the same thickness, the counterfeit coin will not weigh 31.1 grams.

=== Reeding ===
The diagonal reeding was first introduced in the 2001 D (Domestic) Gold Panda Coins. This feature was introduced to other Chinese Panda Coins in 2002.

== Design ==
The center of the obverse is a depiction of The Hall of Prayer for Good Harvests, located in the Temple of Heaven complex in Beijing. The Hall was built between 1406 and 1420. Chinese characters on top say "中华人民共和国", meaning the People's Republic of China and the bottom the year of issue. If the issue is a commemorative issue, the theme will be marked here also. The reverse shows portraits of the giant panda that changes every year (except for 2001 and 2002, which share the same design).

== Minting history ==
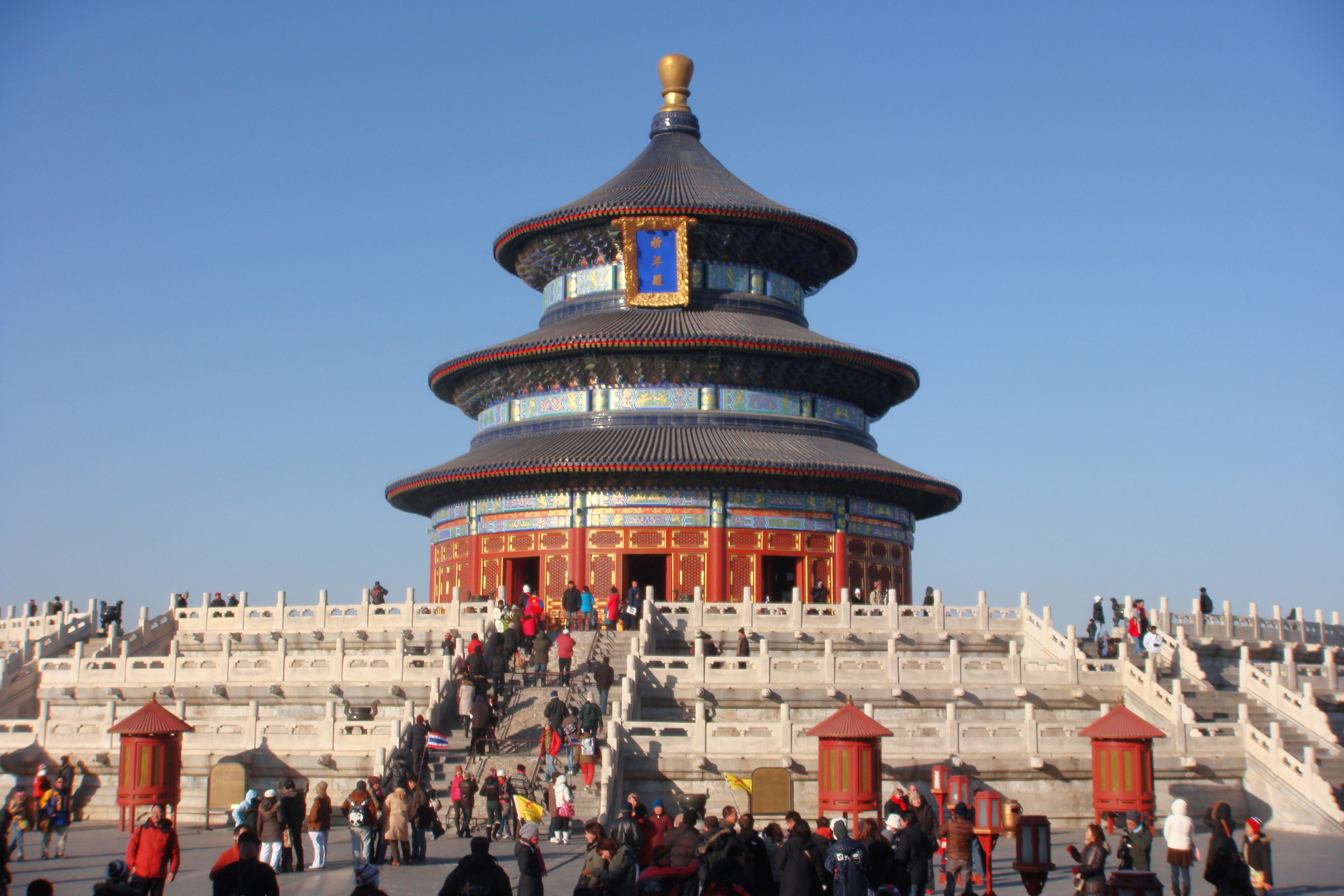
The Hall of Prayer for Good Harvests

A 1998 silver panda with an example of a gilded privy mark for the China Aviation Expo.

There are many varieties of types of coins issued:

1. Bulk Uncirculated
2. Proof
3. Gilding (either side, or both)
4. Colored (only obverse side known)
5. Privy marked for a commemorative issue
6. Extra wording of a special event. For example, where the coins will be sold, such as a coin show or to commemorate an event or place.

Year	Type	Description	Mintage
1983	Proof	Both proof and frosted proof	10,000
1984	Proof		10,000
1985	Proof		10,000
1986	Proof		0
1987	Proof		30,000
1988			0
1989	Proof		8,000
1989	Bulk		255,000
1990	Proof		20,000
1990	Bulk	Both large and small dates	200,000
1991	Proof		20,000
1991	Bulk	Both large and small dates	100,000
1992	Proof		20,000
1992	Bulk	Both large and small dates	100,000
1993	Proof		20,000
1993	Bulk	Both large and small dates	120,000
1994	Proof		20,000
1994	Bulk	Both large and small dates	120,000
1995	Proof		10,000
1995	Bulk	Both large and small dates	200,000
1996	Proof	Both narrow and wide bottom	16,000
1996	Bulk	Large, small and micro dates	120,000
1996	Bulk	Beijing Stamp and Coin Expo	25,000
1997	Proof	Colorized	100,000
1997	Bulk		50,000
1997	Bulk	Large and small dates	50,000
1997	Bulk	Year of Tourism	50,000
1997	Bulk	Chongqing Municipality	50,000
1997	Bulk	Beijing Stamp and Coin Expo	30,000
1998	Proof	Colorized	100,000
1998	Bulk	Large, small and micro dates	250,000
1998	Bulk	China Aviation Expo	50,000
1998	Bulk	Beijing Coin Expo	30,000
1999	Proof	Colorized	100,000
1999	Bulk		70,000
1999	Bulk	Beijing Stamp and Coin Expo	40,000
2000	Bulk	Both frosted and mirrored finishes	70,000
2000	Bulk	Guangzhou Stamp and Coin Expo	40,000
2001	Bulk		250,000
2001	Bulk	Large and small "D". Domestic only sales	250,000
2002	Bulk		500,000
2003	Bulk	Both frosted and satin finishes	600,000
2004	Bulk		600,000
2004	Bulk	50th Anniversary of China Construction Bank	170,000
2004	Bulk	20th Anniversary of Industrial and Commercial Bank of China	120,000
2004	Bulk	Beijing Stamp and Coin Expo	30,000
2005	Bulk		600,000
2005	Bulk	Foundation of Industrial and Commercial Bank of China	100,000
2005	Bulk	10th Anniversary Bank of Shanghai	50,000
2005	Bulk	Beijing Stamp and Coin Expo	30,000
2006	Bulk		600,000
2006	Bulk	10th Anniversary China Minsheng Bank	70,000
2006	Bulk	10th Anniversary Bank of Beijing	50,000
2006	Bulk	Shenyang Horticulture Expo	30,000
2006	Bulk	10th Anniversary Jinan City Bank	20,000
2006	Bulk	Beijing Stamp and Coin Expo	30,000
2007	Bulk		600,000
2007	Bulk	Xi'an City Bank	100,000
2007	Bulk	20th Anniversary of China CITIC Bank	100,000
2008	Bulk		600,000
2008	Bulk	100th Anniversary of Beijing Banknote	100,000
2008	Bulk	100th Anniversary of Bank of Communications	100,000
2009	Bulk		600,000
2009	Bulk	30th Anniversary of Chinese modern precious metal coins	300,000
2009	Bulk	Founding of Agricultural Bank of China	100,000
2009	Bulk	ChiNext Inauguration	30,000
2010	Bulk		800,000
2010	Bulk	Anniversary of listing of Agricultural Bank of China	70,000
2010	Bulk	20th Anniversary of opening China's capital markets	40,000
2010	Bulk	90th Anniversary Shanghai Mint	20,000
2011	Bulk		6,000,000
2011	Bulk	Running of Beijing-Shanghai High Speed Railway	30,000
2011	Bulk	60th Anniv. of National Committee of China's Financial Union	30,000
2011	Bulk	10th Anniversary of Shanghai Gold Exchange	30,000
2011	Bulk	30th Anniv. of the Founding of Xiamen Special Economic Zone	20,000
2011	Bulk	60th Anniversary of the Rural Credit Cooperatives	20,000
2011	Bulk	60th Anniversary of the Aviation Industry	20,000
2011	Bulk	World Horticultural Expo 2011 in Xian	20,000
2012	Bulk		8,000,000
2012	Bulk	100th Anniversary of Bank of China	260,000
2012	Bulk	20th Anniversary of the founding of Huaxia Bank	50,000
2012	Bulk	10th Anniversary of Listing of China Merchants Bank	30,000
2013	Bulk		8,000,000
2013	Bulk	25th Anniversary of Shanghai Pudong Development Bank	80,000
2013	Bulk	30th Anniversary of China Everbright Bank	80,000
2013	Bulk	10th Anniversary of China-Asean Expo	80,000
2014	Bulk		8,000,000
2014	Bulk	60th Anniversary of China Construction Bank	420,000
2014	Bulk	20th Anniv. of the Agricultural Development Bank of China	85,000
2014	Bulk	Qingdao World Horticulture Expo	40,000
2014	Bulk	Singapur International Coin Fair	2,014
2015	Bulk		8,000,000
2015	Bulk	20th Anniversary of Bank of Shanghai	60,000
2015	Bulk	The Year of China in South Africa	10,000
2016	Bulk		8,000,000
2016	Bulk	20th Anniversary of Bank of Beijing	50,000
2016	Bulk	120th Anniversary of Shenyang Mint	30,000
2016	Bulk	60th Anniversary of All-China Federation of Returned Overseas Chinese	20,000
2017	Bulk		10,000,000
2017	Bulk	China International Collection Expo	50,000
2018	Bulk		10,000,000
2018	Bulk	30th Anniversary of China Ping An Insurance Group	50,000
2018	Bulk	30th Anniversary of Industrial Bank	30,000
2019	Bulk		10,000,000
2019	Bulk	China International Import Expo	20,000
2019	Bulk	World Stamp Exhibition	20,000
2019	Bulk	40th Anniversary of State Administration of Foreign Exchange	10,000

== See also ==
- Bullion
- Bullion coin
- Inflation hedge
- Silver as an investment
