= Platinum as an investment =

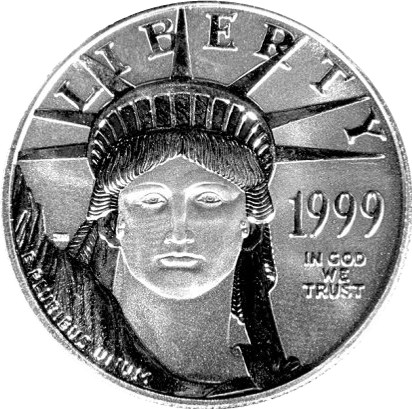
American Platinum Eagle, the official platinum bullion coin of the United States

Investment in platinum is often compared in financial history to gold and silver, which were both known to be used as money in ancient civilizations. Experts posit that platinum is about 30 times scarcer than gold and approximately 100 times scarcer than silver, on the basis of annual mine production.

== Overview ==
Platinum is extremely scarce even when compared to other precious metals. A significant portion of global platinum is mined in South Africa. New mine production totals approximately less than five million troy ounces (160 t) each year. In contrast, gold mine production runs approximately 82,000,000 troy ounces (2,600 t) annually, and silver mine production is approximately 547,000,000 troy ounces (17,000 t) annually.

Platinum is traded on the New York Mercantile Exchange (NYMEX) and the London Platinum and Palladium Market. To be saleable on most international markets, platinum ingots must be assayed and hallmarked.

Platinum is traded in the spot market with the code "XPT". When settled in United States dollars, the code is "XPTUSD".

== Investment vehicles ==
=== Exchange-traded products ===
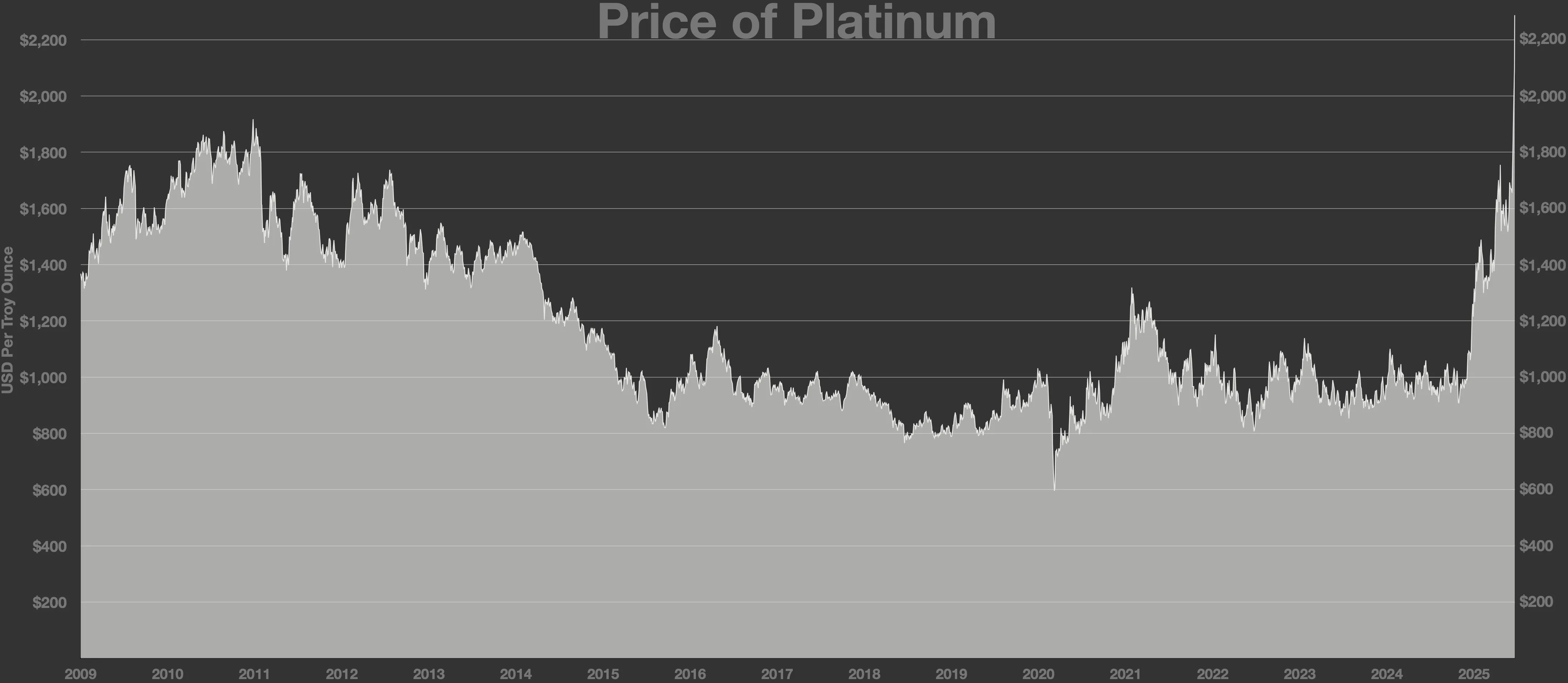
Price of platinum (2009–2025)

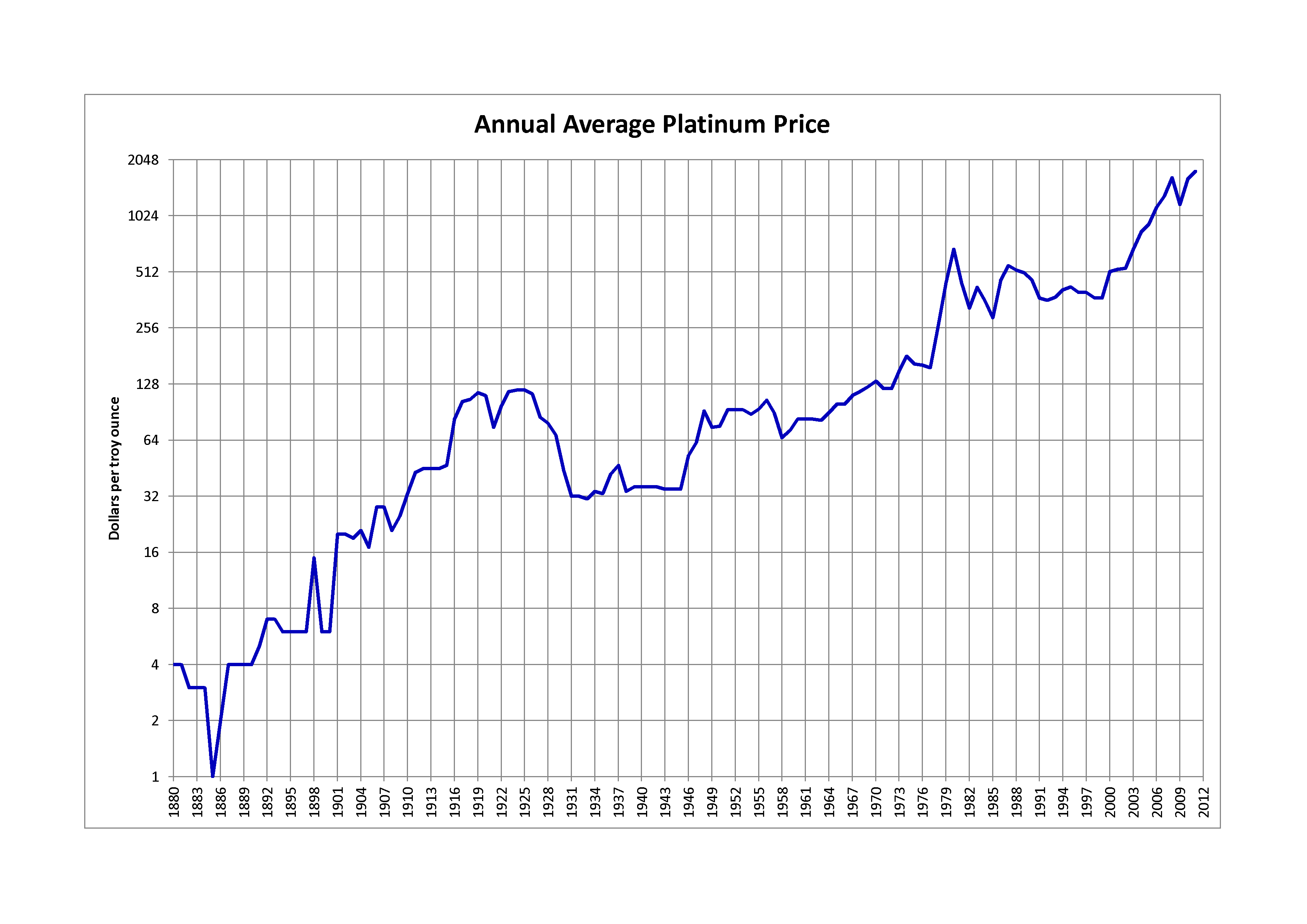
Platinum price (1880–2011)

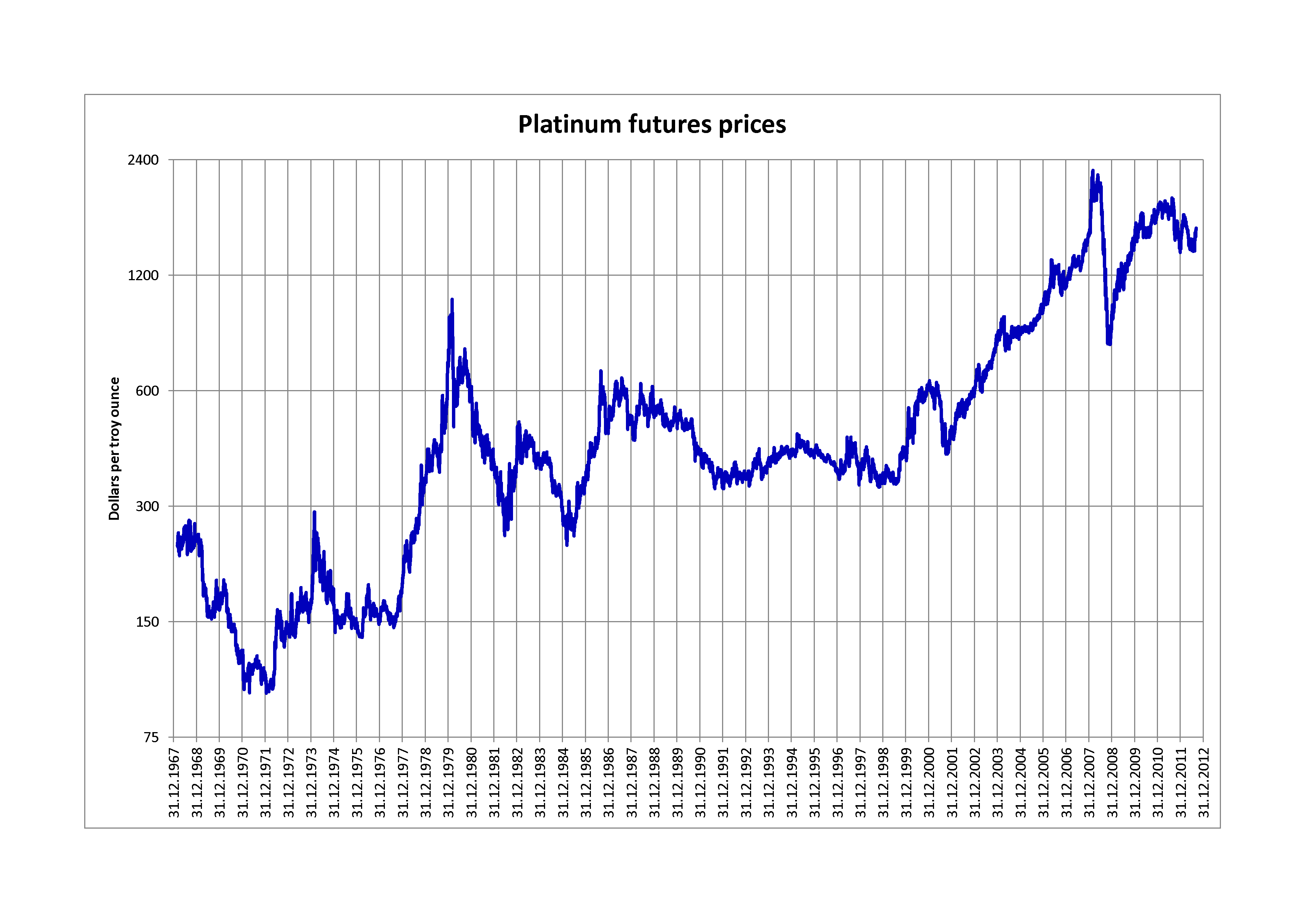
Platinum price (1968–2012)

Platinum is traded as an ETF (exchange-traded fund) on the London Stock Exchange under the ticker symbol LSE: PHPT and on the New York Stock Exchange as ticker symbols PPLT and PLTM There are also several ETNs (exchange-traded note) available.

=== Platinum coins and bars ===
Platinum bars are available from different foundries in different sizes, beginning at 1 gram, on up to 1 oz, and even 10 oz and 1 kg bars. Platinum coins are another way to invest in platinum. Since 1997, the United States Mint has been selling American Platinum Eagle coins to investors.

=== Jewelry as investment ===
Jewelry has long been a store of wealth in countries such as India, with platinum increasingly popular as a metal of choice for jewelry in the nation with one of the highest cultural tendencies for jewelry purchases for both gifts and for investment. This method of preserving wealth is also popular in Europe as well as the United States.

=== Accounts ===
Most Swiss banks offer platinum accounts where platinum can be instantly bought or sold just like any foreign currency. Unlike physical platinum, the customer does not need to touch or come into physical possession of the actual metal but rather has a claim against the bank for a certain quantity of platinum metal.

=== Futures ===
Another investment option is to create a futures contract where a predetermined time and place is designated to buy or sell the platinum. Unlike options, the transaction is an obligation, and not a right. The New York Mercantile Exchange (NYMEX) and the Tokyo Commodity Exchange (TOCOM) trades in platinum futures with a minimum contract size of 50 troy ounces and 500 grams respectively.

=== Other ===
Additional methods of investing in platinum include owning shares in mining companies with substantial platinum assets or exposure, as well as owning traded options in platinum.

== See also ==
- Alternative investment – Investments other than stocks, bonds and cash
- Diamonds as an investment
- Gold as an investment – Use of gold as a store of value and investment asset
- Inflation hedge – Investment intended to protect an investor against inflation or hedge
- List of bullion coins
- London Platinum and Palladium Market
- Palladium as an investment
- Silver as an investment – Investment in the precious metal silver
