= Modification of banknotes of the Russian ruble (2022—2025) =

The 2022-2025 series of banknotes of the Russian Ruble is the latest series of Bank of Russia banknotes with a nominal value of 10 to 5000 rubles. The previous banknotes (from 1997) are planned to be withdrawn from circulation by 2035.

== History ==
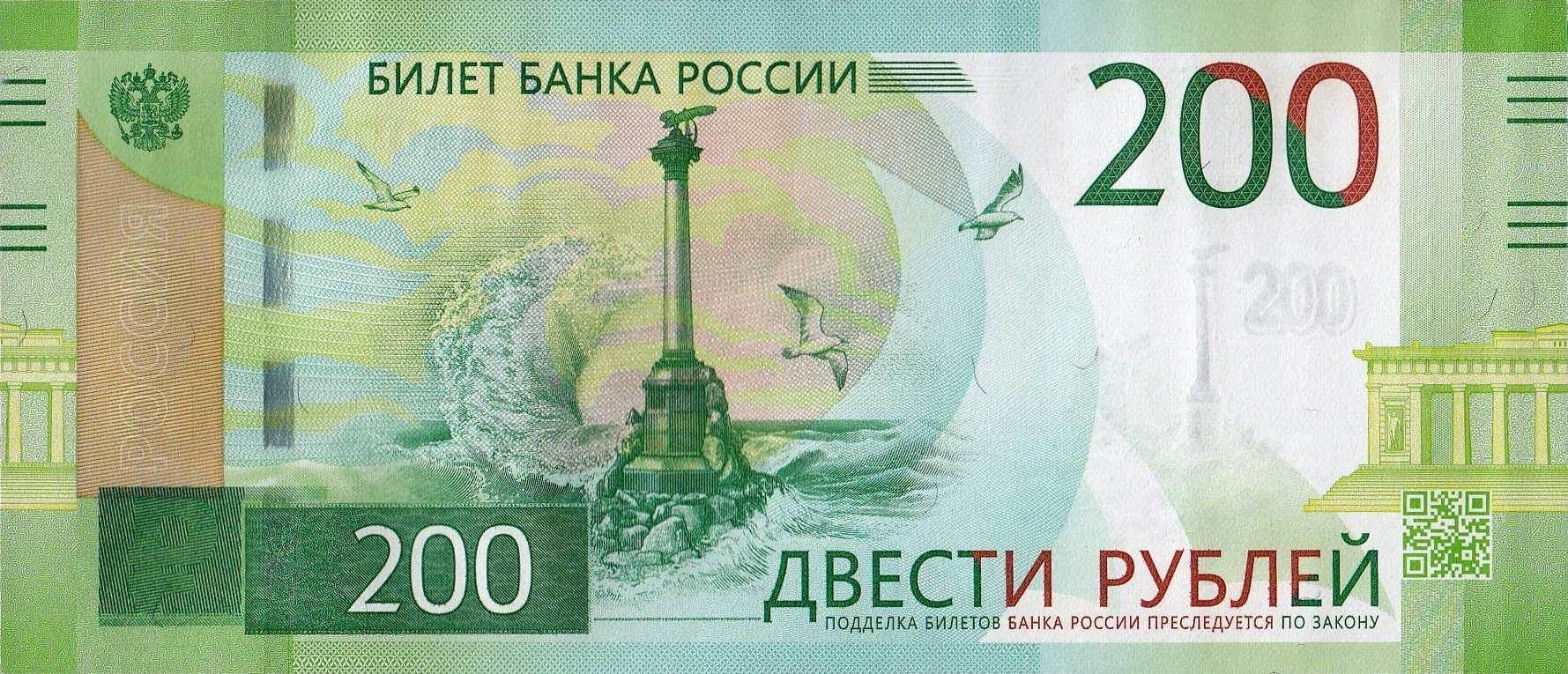
200 rubles 2017 (obverse)

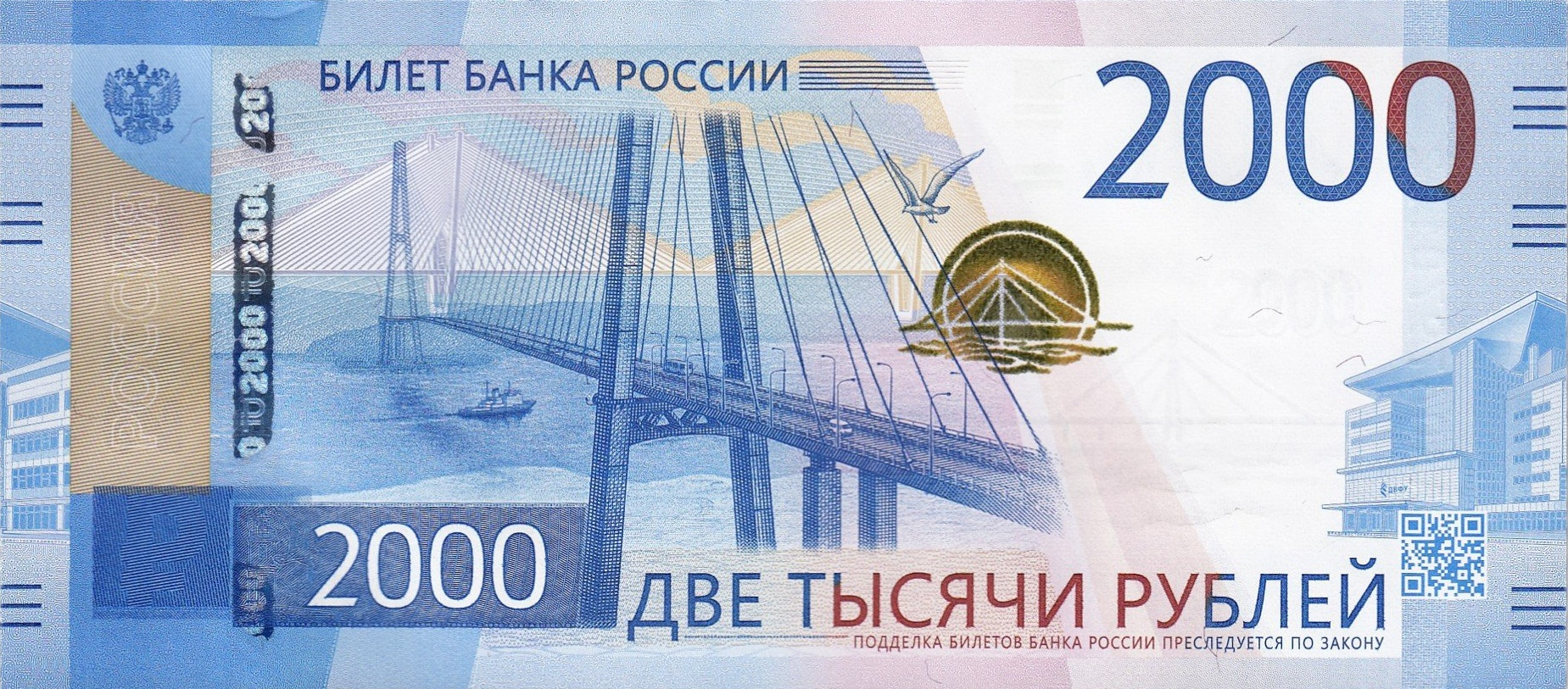
2000 rubles 2017 (obverse)

In 2017, new banknotes were introduced with new denominations of 200 rubles and 2000 rubles, which depict the cities of Sevastopol (internationally recognized as Ukrainian territory along with the entire Crimea while annexed by Russia since 2014) and Vladivostok — the cities of the Southern and Far Eastern Federal Districts of the Russian Federation, respectively. The new designs were voted for on the website твоя-россия.рф. The banknotes were unveiled and put into circulation on October 12, 2017.

In July 2021, the deputy chairman of the Central Bank, Mikhail Alekseev, announced a change in the concept of the "Cities of Russia" series for banknotes. In particular, it was decided to link the obverse of each banknote to the administrative centers (except of the Southern Federal District) of each of the federal districts of Russia, and the reverse to the districts themselves. Mikhail Alekseev explained this decision by the fact that earlier the choice of cities represented on the notes was messy and narrow: "If now about 22 million people live in the cities depicted on the bills, who consider certain banknotes conditionally "their own", then with the expansion of the subject to the regional, every resident of the country will be able to associate himself with a banknote through the region in which he lives". The sights of the cities and districts that will be represented on them will be selected by an expert commission.

Old banknotes will be gradually withdrawn from circulation due to natural wear and tear. It is expected that by 2026 the new banknotes will prevail in active circulation over the old ones. The older notes are planned to be permanently withdrawn from circulation by 2035.

== Differences from previous banknotes ==
A significant difference of the new banknotes is that the new notes have 9-digit serial numbers instead of the 7-digit ones seen on previous notes. Also, the image of the double-headed eagle depicted with lowered wings, and without crowns, a sceptre, or a globus cruciger (the logo of the Bank of Russia since the end of 1993) on their obverse was replaced with the coat of arms of Russia, similar to 1-10 ruble coins, issued since 2016 and commemorative 25 ruble coins, made of base metals.

Visible security features include watermarks, microtext, and iridescence. The new banknotes, according to the Central Bank, will be more reliable and less susceptible to contamination. Also, for the first time, a QR code will appear on the notes, which is also planned to be used as a security element.

== Table of new banknotes ==
Denomination	City (obverse)	Federal District (reverse)	Introduction	Print date
10 rubles	Novosibirsk	Siberian	2028	-
50 rubles	Saint Petersburg	Northwestern	2027	-
100 rubles	Moscow	Central	30 June 2022	by 2022
500 rubles	Pyatigorsk	North Caucasian	2028	-
1000 rubles	Nizhny Novgorod	Volga	26 December 2025	by 2025
5000 rubles	Yekaterinburg	Ural	16 October 2023	by 2023

== 10-ruble banknotes ==
The issue of 10-ruble banknotes was previously discontinued in 2012, as they were completely replaced by 10-ruble coins. Mikhail Alekseev, deputy chairman of the Bank of Russia, explained the decision to resume the issue of 10-ruble notes by saying that it is easier to return banknotes to monetary circulation: "We issue a lot of 10-ruble coins, but they immediately settle in piggy banks and do not return to circulation. At the same time, you cannot put a banknote in a piggy bank, it's much easier to find a place for it in a wallet. In addition, it is easier to transport banknotes than coins. Thus, replacing coins with banknotes make sense both from the side of reducing our costs and from the side of usability".

The 10-ruble banknote will depict Novosibirsk and the Siberian Federal District. Novosibirsk will replace another Siberian city, Krasnoyarsk, which was featured on the banknotes of the 1997 series. This marks the first time that Novosibirsk will be presented on a Bank of Russia bill. The Central Bank plans to put this note into circulation, along with the modernized 500-ruble note, by 2028.

== 50-ruble banknotes ==
The new 50-ruble banknote will depict St. Petersburg and the Northwestern Federal District. St. Petersburg retains its place compared to the banknotes of the previous design. The Central Bank plans to put this new note into circulation by 2027.

== 100-ruble banknotes ==
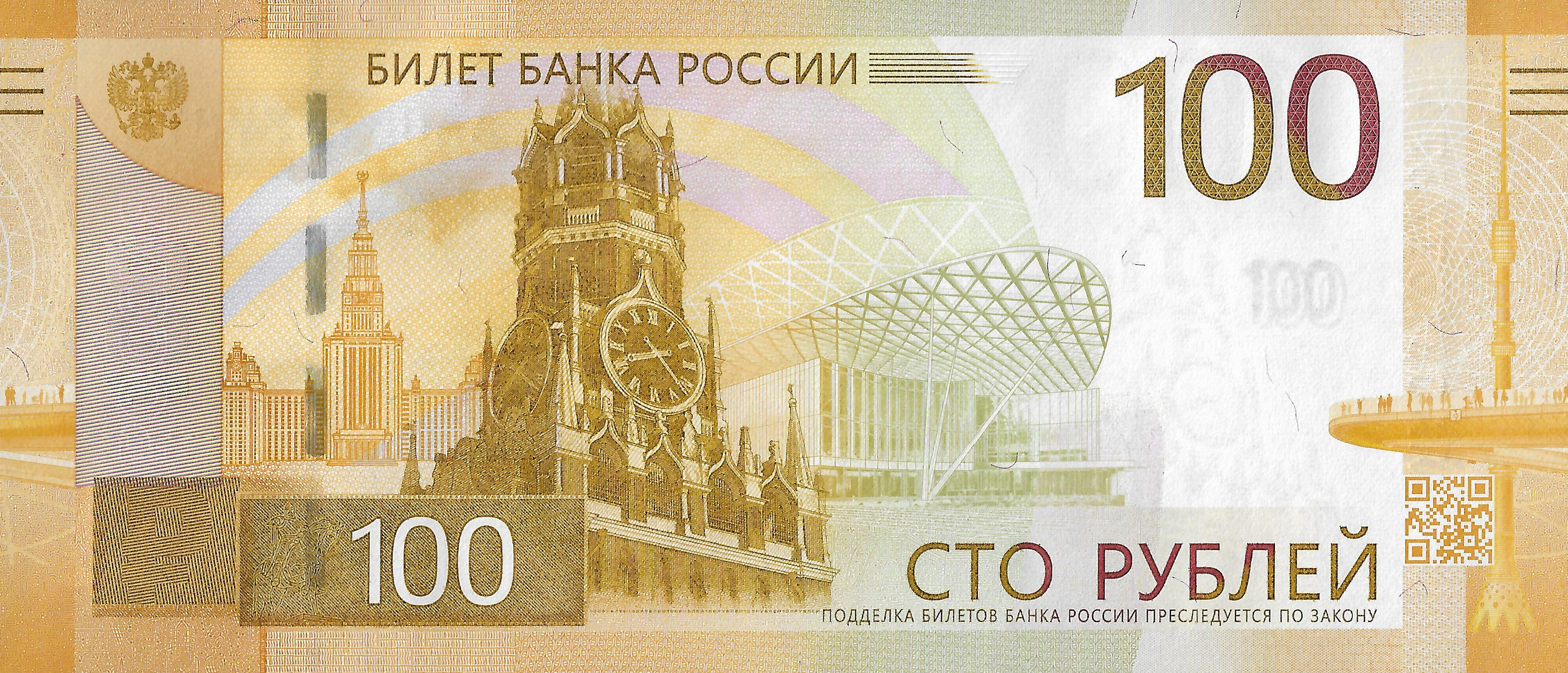
Obverse of a 2022 and a 2026 100-ruble note

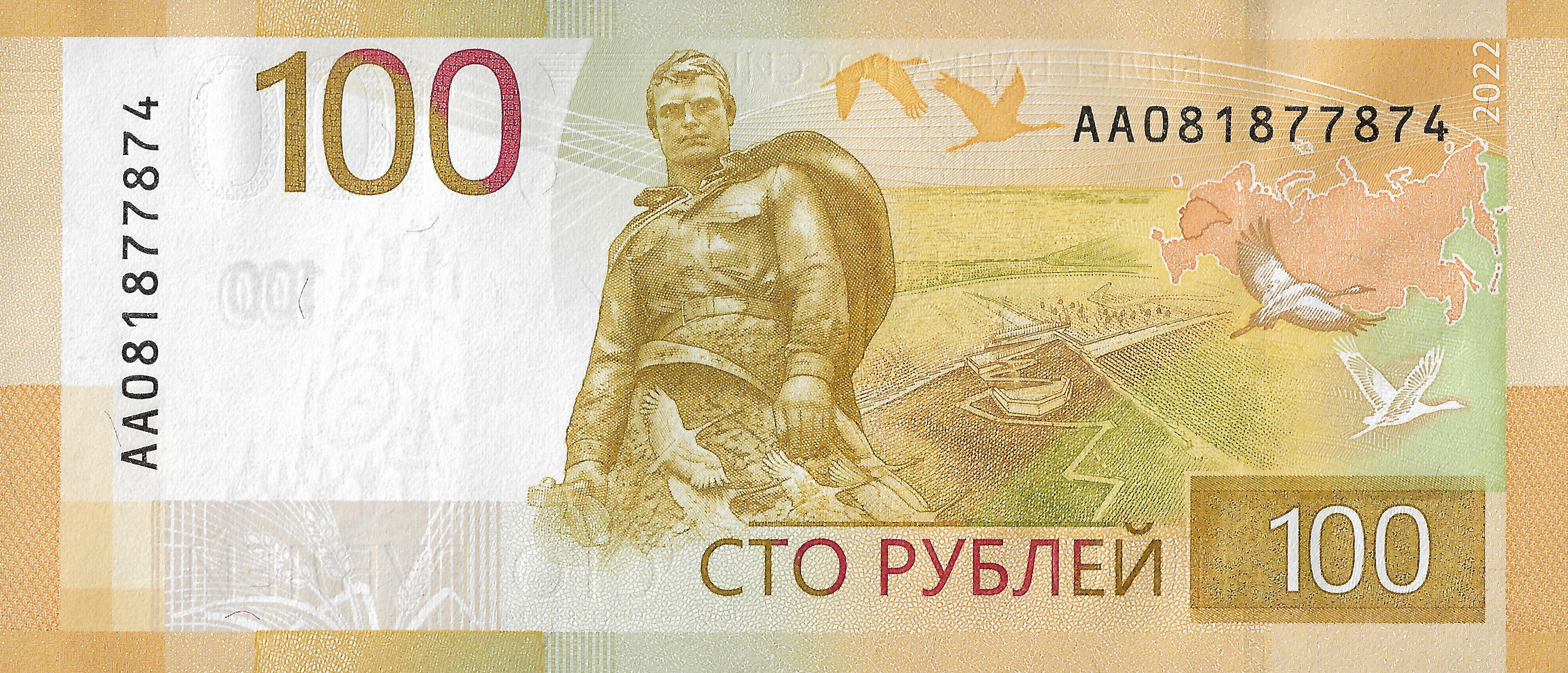
Reverse of a 2022 100-ruble note

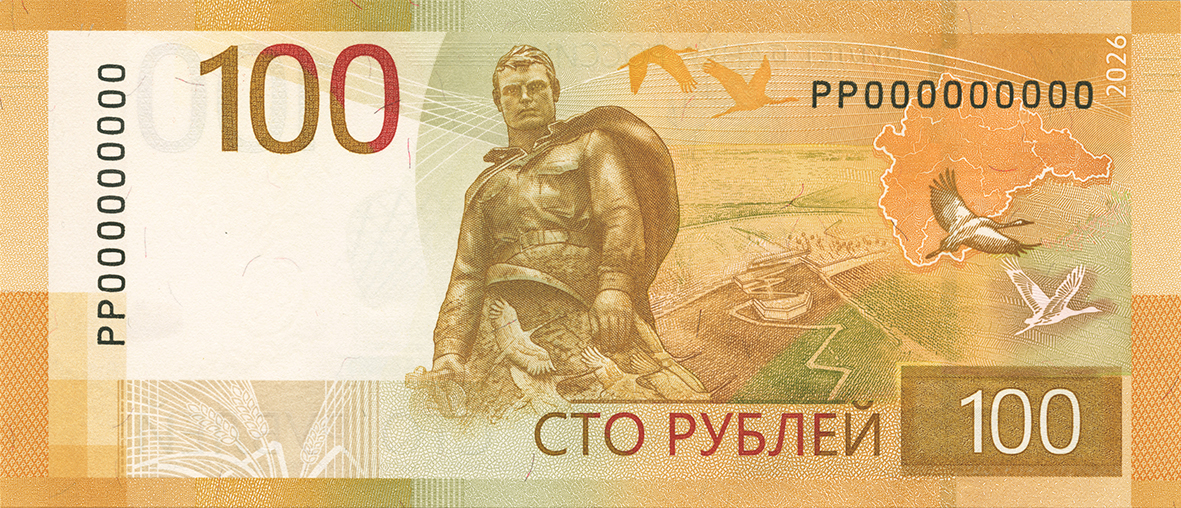
Reverse of a 2026 100-ruble note

The Bank of Russia unveiled the design for the new 100-ruble banknote on 30 June 2022. It entered circulation as legal tender that same day. Like previous versions, the updated note features images of Moscow on the obverse, but it now also includes landmarks from the Central Federal District on the reverse side.

Measuring 150 × 65 mm, the note maintains the same dimensions as the 200-ruble banknote introduced in 2017. While its primary color remains orange, the design has been modernized. The obverse continues the established Moscow theme, depicting landmarks such as the Kremlin's Spasskaya Tower, the main building of Moscow State University, Zaryadye Park, and the Ostankino and Shukhov TV towers. Notably, the chimes on the Spasskaya Tower are set to 20:22, commemorating its year of issue.

The reverse side introduces a new focus on the Central Federal District, featuring monuments tied to military history of Russia located within that district, including Kulikovo Field and the Rzhev Memorial to the Soviet Soldier. The bill also includes a QR code that links directly to the Bank of Russia’s website, providing detailed information on the note's artistic design and security features.

On July 10, 2026, the Central Bank of Russia issued a new 100 Ruble-note with the map of Russia changed to just to the map of the Central Federal District.

== 500-ruble banknotes ==
Pyatigorsk and the North Caucasus Federal District will be featured on the new 500-ruble banknote. Pyatigorsk is set to replace Arkhangelsk, which has been depicted on 500-ruble notes since the 1997 series.

The Bank of Russia currently plans to introduce the modernized 500-ruble note, along with a new 10-ruble banknote, by 2028. Public voting for the landmarks to be included on the 500-ruble note began in late 2025, with popular choices including the Academic Gallery in Pyatigorsk and Mount Elbrus.

== 1000-ruble banknotes ==
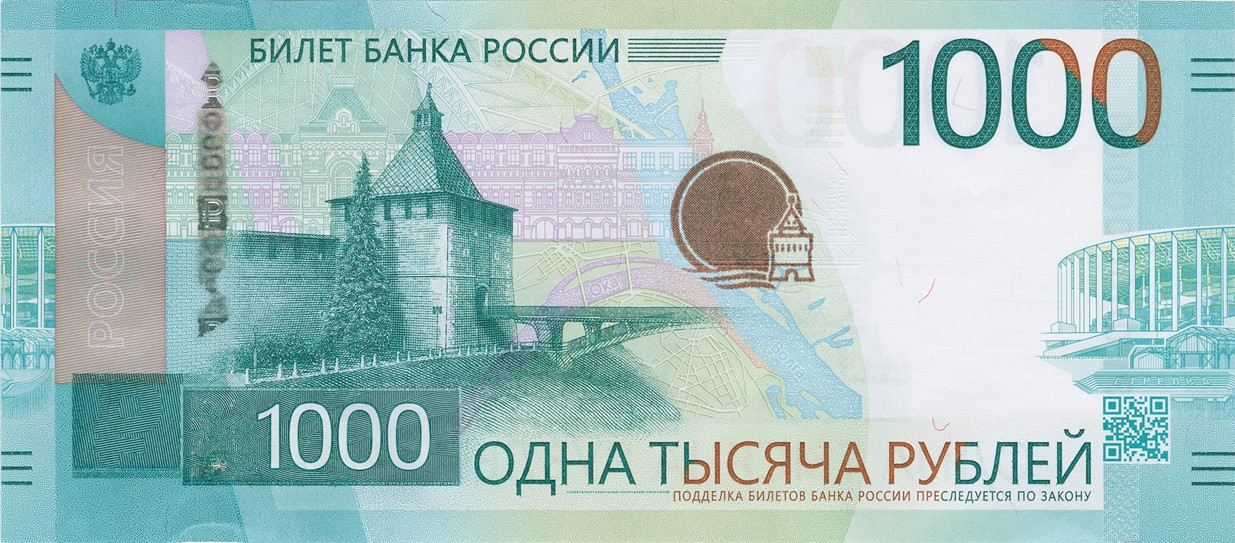
Obverse of the original 2023 and current 2025 1000-ruble note design

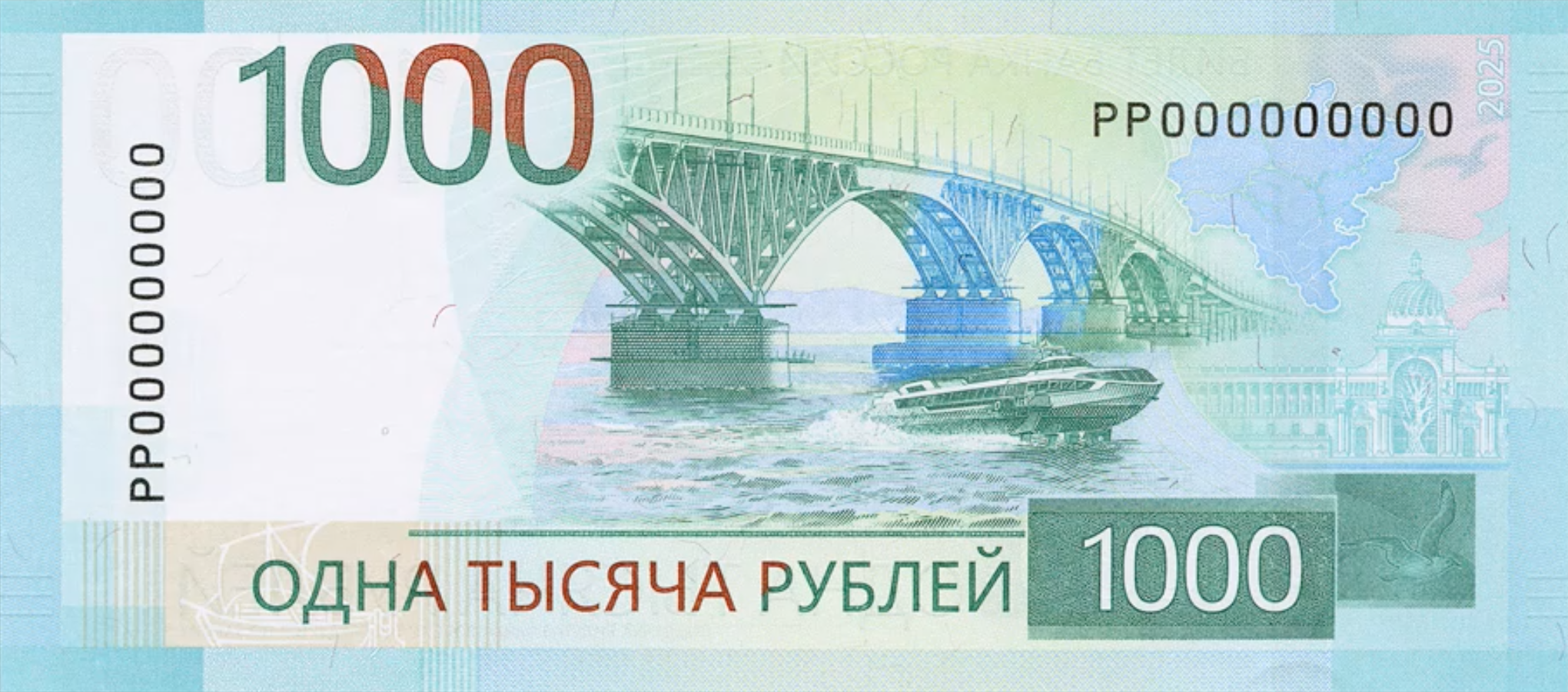
Reverse of the current 2025 1000-ruble note design

Nizhny Novgorod and the Volga Federal District are depicted on the new 1000-ruble banknote. Nizhny Novgorod has taken the place of Yaroslavl, which was featured on the previous 1000-ruble notes. The updated banknote was unveiled and put into circulation on 26 December 2025.

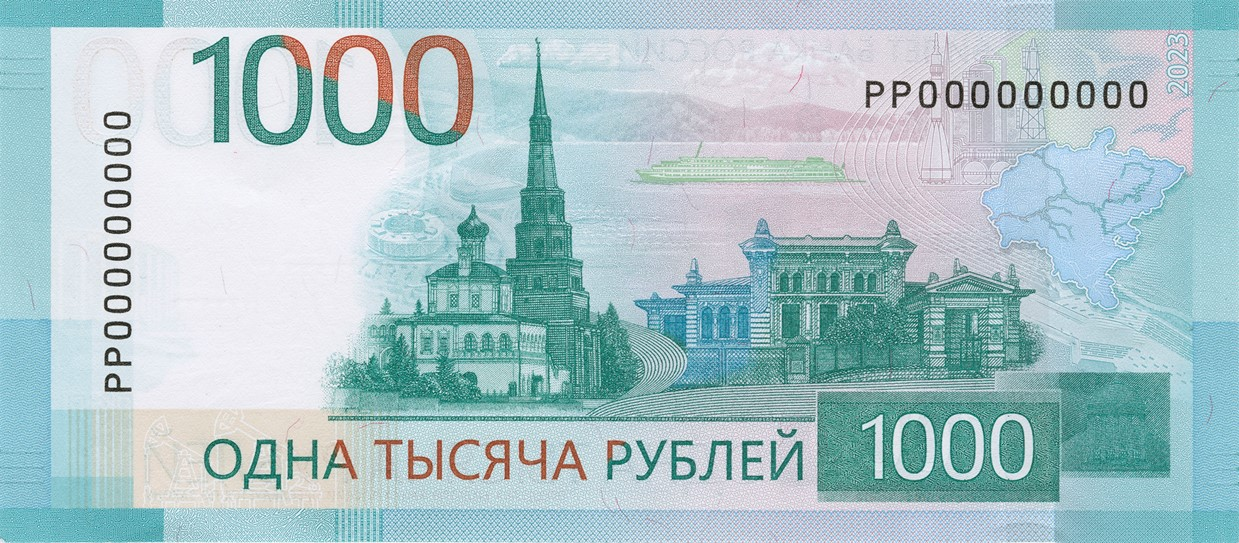
Reverse of the original 2023 1000-ruble note design

The obverse of the note features the Nikolskaya Tower of the Nizhny Novgorod Kremlin, the spit of the Oka and Volga rivers, the Nizhny Novgorod Fair, and the Nizhny Novgorod Stadium. This side's composition remains identical to the initially proposed 2023 design. The reverse showcases other landmarks from across the Volga Federal District: the Saratov Bridge, the 'Meteor' high-speed hydrofoil vessel, and the Agricultural Palace in Kazan.

On 16 October 2023, the day the initial redesign was unveiled, the Russian Orthodox Church criticized the design for displaying an Islamic crescent on a building on the reverse side while excluding an Orthodox cross from a nearby former church (now a museum). The Bank of Russia stated the image was not intended to disregard any faith but announced the following day that the design would be revised and the 2023 notes would not be issued.

== 5000-ruble banknotes ==
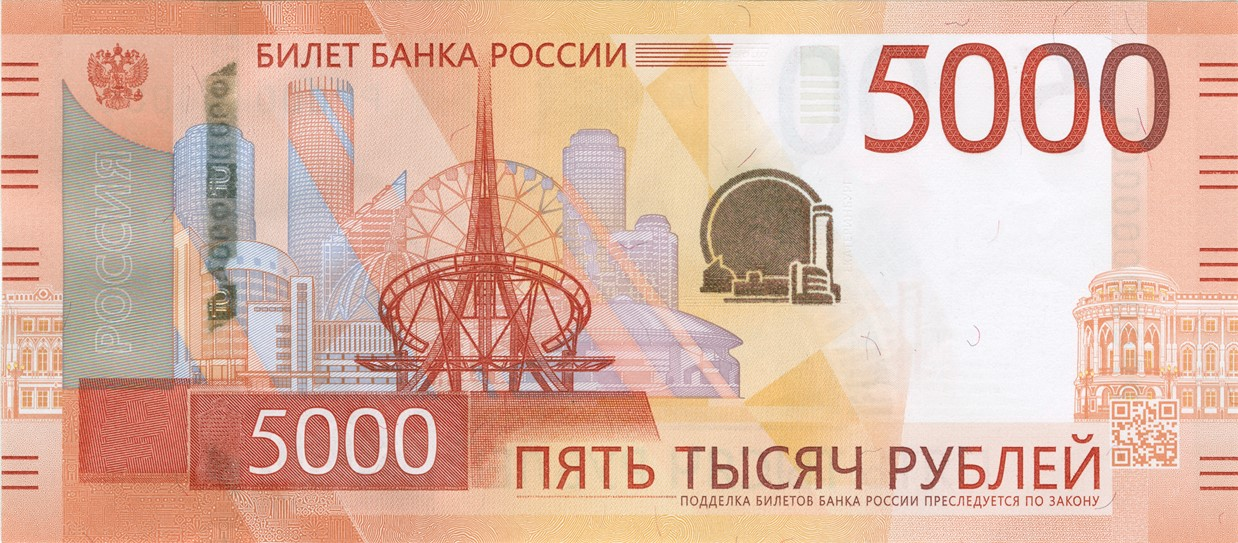
Obverse of a 2023 5000-ruble note

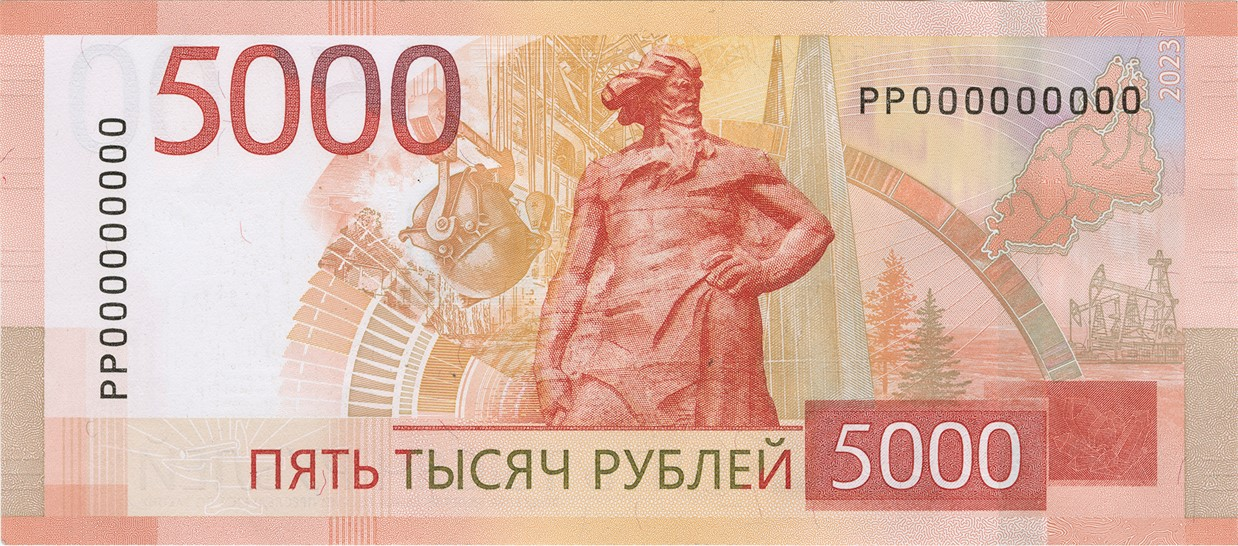
Reverse of a 2023 5000-ruble note

Yekaterinburg and the Ural Federal District are depicted on the new 5,000-ruble banknote. Yekaterinburg has replaced Khabarovsk, which was featured on the previous 5,000-ruble notes. The updated banknote was unveiled and put into circulation on 16 October 2023.

== Criticism ==
Some experts were skeptical about the reform and believe that the banknotes will have to be put into circulation much later than the Central Bank plan due to the fact that the process of adapting cash registers and ATMs to support new banknotes would be very delayed by the sanctions.

== See also ==
- Russian ruble
- Central Bank of Russia
