= Saratov (disambiguation) =

Saratov is a major city in southern Russia.

Saratov may also refer to:

- Saratov Oblast, a federal subject of Russia
- Saratov Hydroelectric Station, a hydroelectric power plant on the Volga River, Russia
- Saratov Reservoir, an artificial lake in the lower part of the Volga River, Russia
- Saratov Airlines, a Russian airline headquartered in Saratov, Russia
- The Saratov Approach, a film about the kidnapping of two Mormon missionaries in this area of Russia
- Russian landing ship Saratov, a Russian Tapir-class landing ship which was sunk on 24 March during the 2022 Russian invasion of Ukraine

== See also ==
- Saratov Bridge, a bridge across the Volga River in the city of Saratov
- Saratov South, a former air base in Russia
- Saratov West, a former air base in Russia
- Saratovsky (disambiguation)
