= Saratovsky (rural locality) =

Saratovsky (Russian: Саратовский; masculine), Saratovskaya (Саратовская; feminine), or Saratovskoye (Саратовское; neuter) is the name of several rural localities in Russia:

- Saratovsky, Republic of Adygea, a khutor in Krasnogvardeysky District of the Republic of Adygea
- Saratovsky, Kugarchinsky District, Republic of Bashkortostan, a khutor in Isimovsky Selsoviet of Kugarchinsky District of the Republic of Bashkortostan
- Saratovsky, Zilairsky District, Republic of Bashkortostan, a khutor in Dmitriyevsky Selsoviet of Zilairsky District of the Republic of Bashkortostan
- Saratovsky, Kabardino-Balkar Republic, a khutor in Prokhladnensky District of the Kabardino-Balkar Republic
- Saratovsky, Krasnodar Krai, a khutor in Bratsky Rural Okrug of Ust-Labinsky District of Krasnodar Krai
- Saratovsky, Stavropol Krai, a khutor in Kazminsky Selsoviet of Kochubeyevsky District of Stavropol Krai
- Saratovskoye, Russia, a settlement in Vesnovsky Rural Okrug of Krasnoznamensky District of Kaliningrad Oblast
- Saratovskaya (rural locality), a stanitsa in Saratovsky Rural Okrug under the administrative jurisdiction of the Town of Goryachy Klyuch, Krasnodar Krai
