= Russian ruble =

Currency of Russia

Russian ruble (rouble)
российский рубль (Note: Abkhaz: Урыстәылатәи амааҭ Urysta̋ylata̋i amaaţ; Altay: орус салковой orus salkovoy; Bashkir: Рәсәй һумы Räsäy humı; Russian Buryat: Ородой дүхэриг Orodoy düherig; Chechen: Россин рубль Rossin rubl; Chuvash: Раççей тенкĕ Raşşej tenkĕ; Erzya: Россиянь целковой Rossijań ćelkovoj; Ingush: россе сом rosse som; Kabardian: Урысей рубл Urısey rubl; Karachay-Balkar: Эресей сом Eresey som; Komi: Рочмуса шайт Roćmusa šajt; Lak: аьрасатнал къуруш ərasatnal quruş; Lezgian: Урусатдин рубль Urusatdin rubl; Mari: российысе теҥге rossijyse teŋge; Iron Ossetic: Уæрæсейы сом Uæræsejy som; Tatar: Россия сумы Rossiya sumı; Tuvan: орус рубль orus rubl; Udmurt: Россиысь манет Rossiyś manet; Yakut: Арассыыйа солкуобайа Arassııya solkuobaya) (Russian) руб, р, Rub
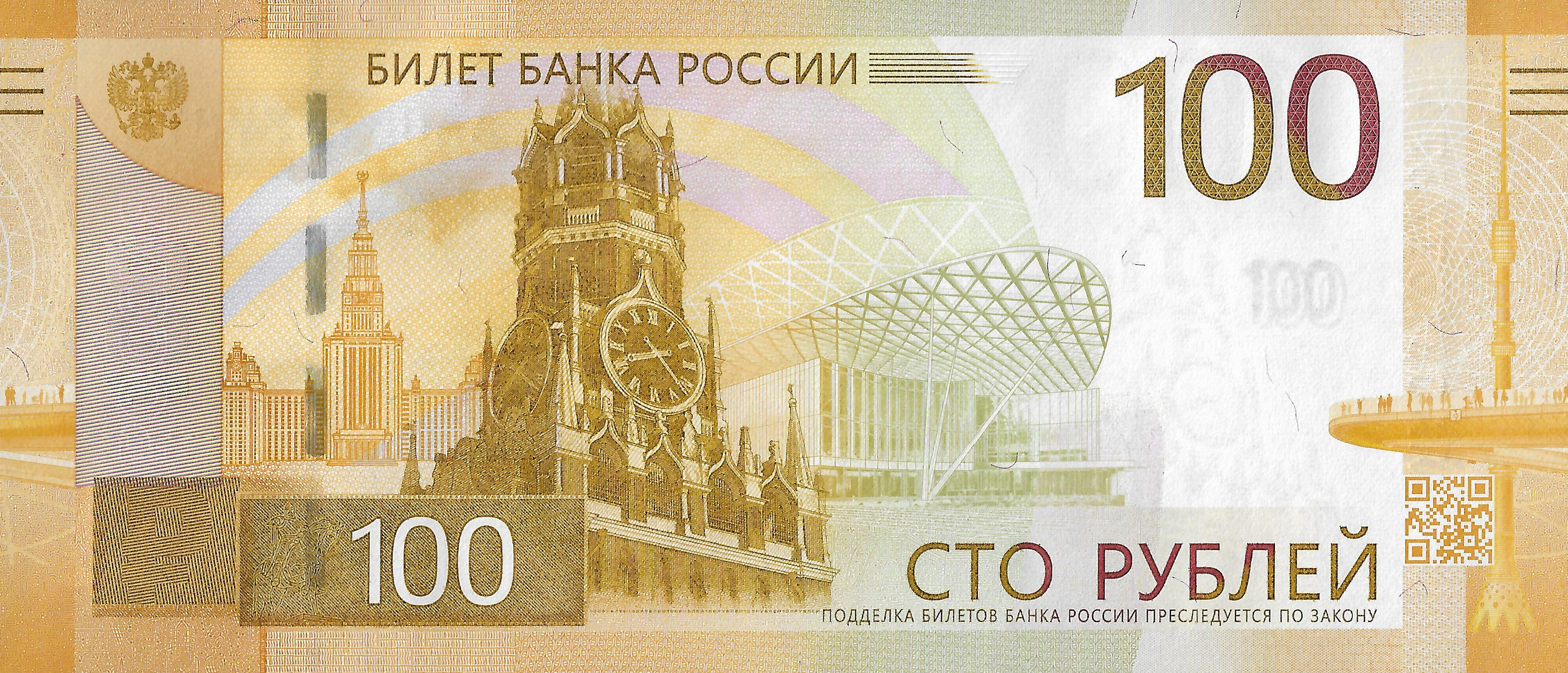
100 ₽ banknote (2022)
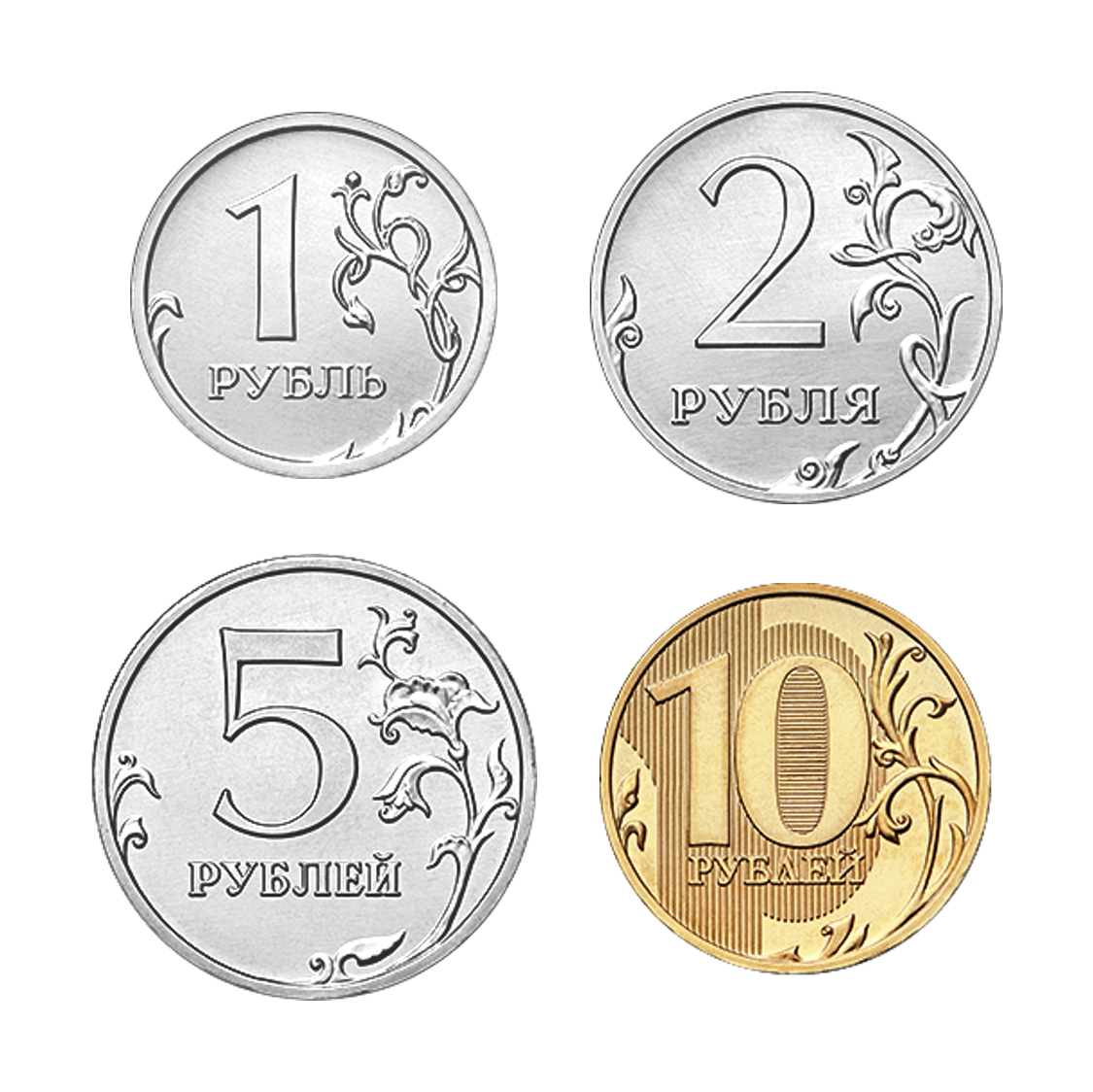
Current ruble coins

ISO 4217
- Code: RUB (numeric: 643); RUR (numeric: 810) (1992–1997)
- Subunit: 0.01

Units of account
- Base unit: ruble (Russian: рубль)
- Plural: The language(s) of this currency belong(s) to the Slavic languages. There is more than one way to construct plural forms.
- Symbol: ₽
- Subunit
- 1/100: kopeyka (kopeck) (Note: Kopeyka-denominated coins are now rarely used due to inflation.) (Russian: копейка; (Note: Tatar: тиен tiyen; Bashkir: тин tin; Chuvash: пус pus; Iron Ossetic: капекк kapekk; Udmurt: коны kony; Mari: ыр yr; Yakut: харчы harchy) abbreviation: коп)
- Symbol
- kopeyka (kopeck) (Note: Kopeyka-denominated coins are now rarely used due to inflation.): к

Denominations
- Banknotes: 5 ₽, 10 ₽, 50 ₽, 100 ₽, 200 ₽, 500 ₽, 1,000 ₽, 2,000 ₽, 5,000 ₽
- Coins
- Freq. used: 1 ₽, 2 ₽, 5 ₽, 10 ₽
- Rarely used: 1, 5, 10, 50 kopecks

Demographics
- Date of introduction: c. 1300; 726 years ago (Note: The ruble was first introduced c. 1300 in the Russian principalities. In 1704, the Russian ruble was decimalised during the reign of Peter the Great, making it the world's first decimal currency. The Russian ruble was reissued as the Soviet ruble between 1922 and 1992. In 1992, the Soviet ruble was replaced with the Russian ruble in Russia.)
- Replaced: Soviet ruble (1922–1992)
- User(s): Russian Federation; 1 leased territory: Baikonur (1992–present); 8 disputed territories: Abkhazia (1992–); South Ossetia (1992–); Republic of Crimea (2014–); Sevastopol (2014–); Donetsk People's Republic (2014–); Luhansk People's Republic (2014–); Zaporizhzhia Oblast (2022–); Kherson Oblast (2022–); Multiple historical users: Grand Principality of Moscow (c. 1300–1547); Tsardom of Russia (1547–1721); Russian Empire (1721–1917); Russian SFSR (1917–1922); Kyrgyzstan (1992–1993); Moldova (1992–1993); Turkmenistan (1992–1993); Armenia (1992–1994); Azerbaijan (1992–1994); Belarus (1992–1994); Georgia (1992–1994); Kazakhstan (1992–1994); Uzbekistan (1992–1994); Tajikistan (1992–1995)

Issuance
- Central bank: Central Bank of Russia
- Website: www.cbr.ru
- Printer: Goznak
- Website: www.goznak.ru
- Mint: Moscow Mint and Saint Petersburg Mint
- Website: mmd.goznak.ru, spmd.goznak.ru

Valuation
- Inflation: 5.9% (March 2026)
- Source: Central Bank of Russia
- Method: CPI

The ruble (or rouble (Note: Ruble is more common in North American English. Rouble is more common in British English.)) (Russian: рубль, romanized: rublʹ, [ˈrublʲ]; symbol: ₽; ISO code: RUB) is the official currency of the Russian Federation. Banknotes and coins are issued by the Central Bank of Russia, which is Russia's monetary authority independent of all other government bodies.

Each ruble is technically subdivided into 100 kopeyka (kopecks), but kopeck-denominated coins are now rarely used due to inflation. It is the second-oldest currency in continuous use, after British sterling. It was also the first decimal currency.

The ruble was the currency of the Russian Empire and later the Soviet Union, where it was known as the Soviet ruble (code: SUR, 810). Following the dissolution of the Soviet Union in 1991, the Soviet ruble was replaced in Russia with the Russian ruble (code: RUR, 810) at par in the following year. The Russian ruble continued to be used in 11 post-Soviet states, forming a "ruble zone" until 1993. In 1998, the ruble was redenominated (code: RUB, 643) shortly before the 1998 financial crisis, at a rate of 1000 RUR = 1 RUB. (Note: Code "RUR, 810" was then excluded from both the ISO 4217 standard and the Russian currency classifier, but continues to be used for numbering bank accounts internally within Russia.)

The ruble is a free-floating currency, and in 2023, the digital ruble was introduced. The Russian ruble is also used as a de facto legal tender in Baikonur, Abkhazia and South Ossetia.

== History ==
=== Overview ===
The ruble has been used in Russian territories since the 14th century, and is the second-oldest currency still in circulation, behind sterling. Historically, the grivna, ruble and denga were used across Russian territories as measurements of weight. As a result of monetary reforms by Peter the Great, the ruble was minted in Russia as a circulating coin in 1704, shortly before the establishment of the Russian Empire. It was also the first currency in Europe to be decimalised in 1704, when it was divided into 100 kopecks. The silver ruble was used until 1897, and the gold ruble was used until 1917.

The Soviet ruble officially replaced the imperial ruble in 1922 and continued to be used until 1993, when it was formally replaced with the Russian ruble in the Russian Federation and by other currencies in other post-Soviet states. The ruble has seen several incarnations and redenominations during its history, the latest of which is the introduction in 1998 of the current Russian ruble (code: RUB) at the rate of 1 RUB = 1,000 RUR.

=== Etymology ===
According to one version, the word "ruble" is derived from the Russian verb рубить (rubit), "to cut, to chop, to hack", as a ruble was considered a cutout piece of a silver grivna. According to Ivan Kondratyev:

Rubles were parts of the grivna or pieces of silver with notches indicating their weight. Each grivna was divided into four parts; the name "ruble" came from the word "cut" because the silver rod weighing 1 grivna was split into four parts, which were called rubles.

Others say the ruble was never part of a grivna but a synonym for it. This is attested in a 13th-century birch bark manuscript from Novgorod, where both ruble and grivna referred to 204 grams (6.6 troy ounces) of silver. The casting of these pieces included some sort of cutting (the exact technology is unknown), hence the name from рубить (rubit). Another version of the word's origin is that it comes from the Russian noun рубец (rubets), the seam that is left around a silver bullions after casting: silver was added to the cast in two steps. Therefore, the word "ruble" means "a cast with a seam". A popular theory deriving the word ruble from rupee is probably not correct.

The ruble was the Russian equivalent of the mark, a measurement of weight for silver and gold used in medieval Western Europe. The weight of one ruble was equal to the weight of one grivna. Since the monetary reform of 1534, one Russian accounting ruble became equivalent to 100 silver Novgorod denga coins or smaller 200 Moscow denga coins or even smaller 400 polushka coins. Exactly the former coin with a rider on it soon became colloquially known as kopecks and was the higher coin until the beginning of the 18th century. Silver ruble coins entered circulation in 1654 but it was not until during the reign of Peter the Great did Russia completely shift to domestically minted silver ruble coins. In 1704, he reformed the old monetary system and ordered mintage of a 28 g (0.90 ozt) silver ruble coin equivalent to 100 new copper kopeck coins. Apart from one ruble and one kopeck coins, other smaller and greater coins existed as well.

Both the spellings ruble and rouble are used in English, depending on the author's native dialect. The earliest use recorded in English is the now completely obsolete robble. The form rouble is preferred by the Oxford English Dictionary and probably derives from the transliteration into French used among the Tsarist aristocracy. It may have been retained in English to avoid confusion with "rubble". In general, American, and some Canadian, authors tend to use "ruble" while other English-speaking authors use "rouble". In American English there is a tendency for older sources to use rouble and more recent ones to use ruble. However, usage is not consistent and major publications are known to use both (though usually preferring one or the other).

The Russian plurals that may be seen on the actual currency are modified according to Russian grammar. Numbers ending in 1 (except for 11) are followed by nominative singular рубль rubl, копейка kopeyka. Numbers ending in 2, 3 or 4 (except for 12–14) are followed by genitive singular рубля rublya, копейки kopeyki. Numbers ending in 5–9, 0, or 11–14 are followed by genitive plural рублей rubley, копеек kopeyek.

In several languages spoken in Russia and the former Soviet Union, the currency name has no etymological relation with ruble. Especially in Turkic languages or languages influenced by them, the ruble is often known (also officially) as som or sum (meaning pure), or manat (from Russian moneta, meaning coin). Soviet ruble banknotes had their value printed in the languages of all 15 republics of the Soviet Union.

=== Early history ===
The coinage system in medieval Russia was connected to a system of weights. The grivna was used in Russia as the basic monetary unit, but during the 14th and 15th centuries, it was replaced by the ruble as the primary accounting unit. The first chronicle mention of the ruble as an accounting unit is found under the year 1316. In the second half of the 14th century, Dmitry Donskoy issued the ruble and a smaller coin known as the denga (pl. dengi). The relative value of the ruble differed between regions in the country. In the Sudebnik of 1497, the ruble was equal to 200 dengi and the altyn was equal to 6 dengi.

There were two variants of the denga, minted in Novgorod and Moscow. The weight of a denga silver coin was unstable and inflating, but by 1535, following the monetary reform of Elena Glinskaya, one Novgorod denga weighed 0.68 g (0.022 ozt), the Moscow denga being a half that of the Novgorod denga. Thus, one accounting ruble consisted of 100 Novgorod or 200 Moscow dengi (68 g (2.2 ozt) of silver). As the Novgorod denga bore the image of a rider with a spear (Russian: копьё, kop’yo), it later has become known as the kopeck. In the 17th century, the weight of a kopeck coin reduced to 0.48 g (0.015 ozt), thus one ruble was equal to 48 g (1.5 ozt) of silver.

In 1654–1655, Tsar Alexis of Russia carried out a monetary reform and ordered the mintage of silver one ruble coins from imported joachimsthalers and new kopeck coins from copper (old silver kopecks were left in circulation). Although around a million of such rubles was made, its lower weight (28–32 grams) against the nominal ruble (48 g) led to counterfeiting, speculation and inflation, and after the Copper Riot of 1662, the new monetary system was abandoned in favour of the old one.

=== Imperial ruble (1704–1922) ===
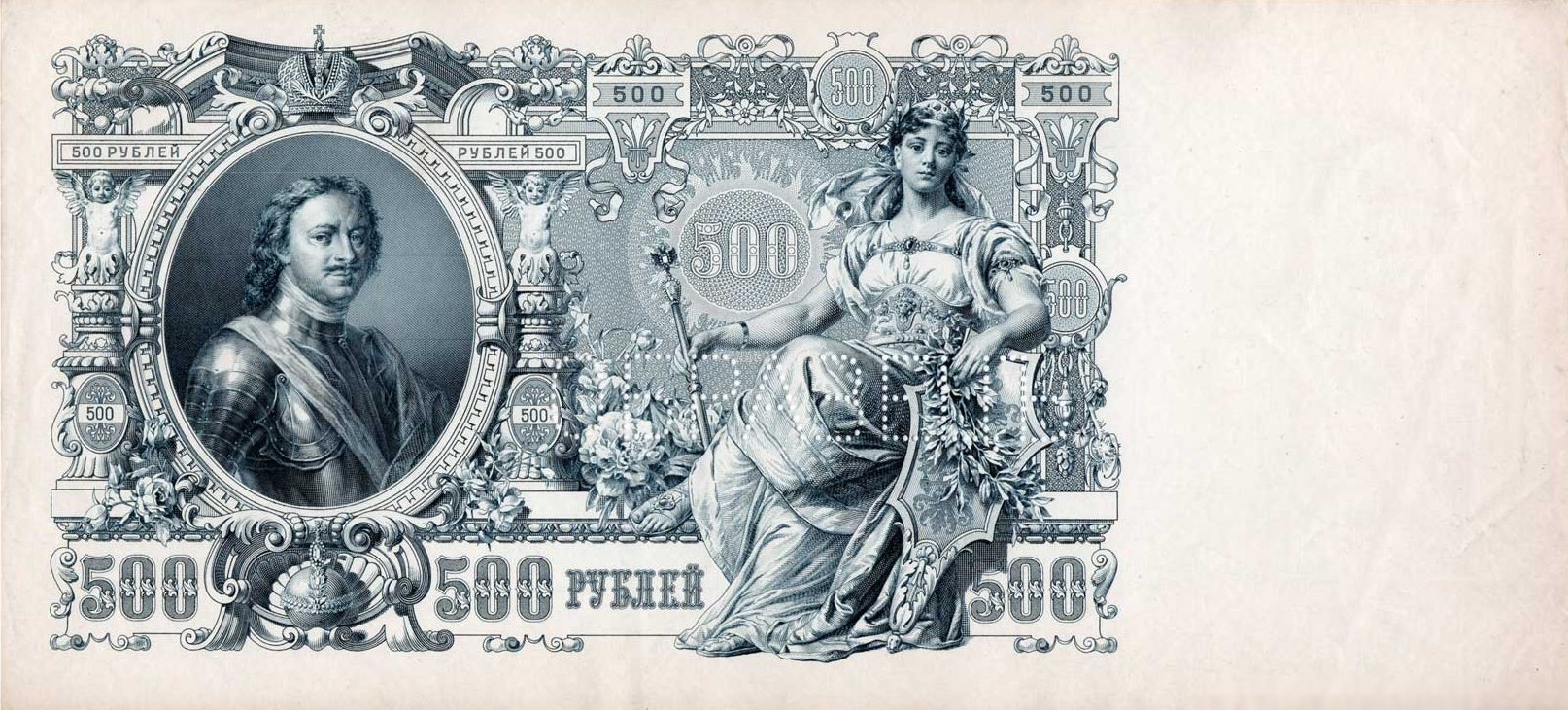
Five hundred ruble note featuring Peter the Great and a personification of Mother Russia, 1912

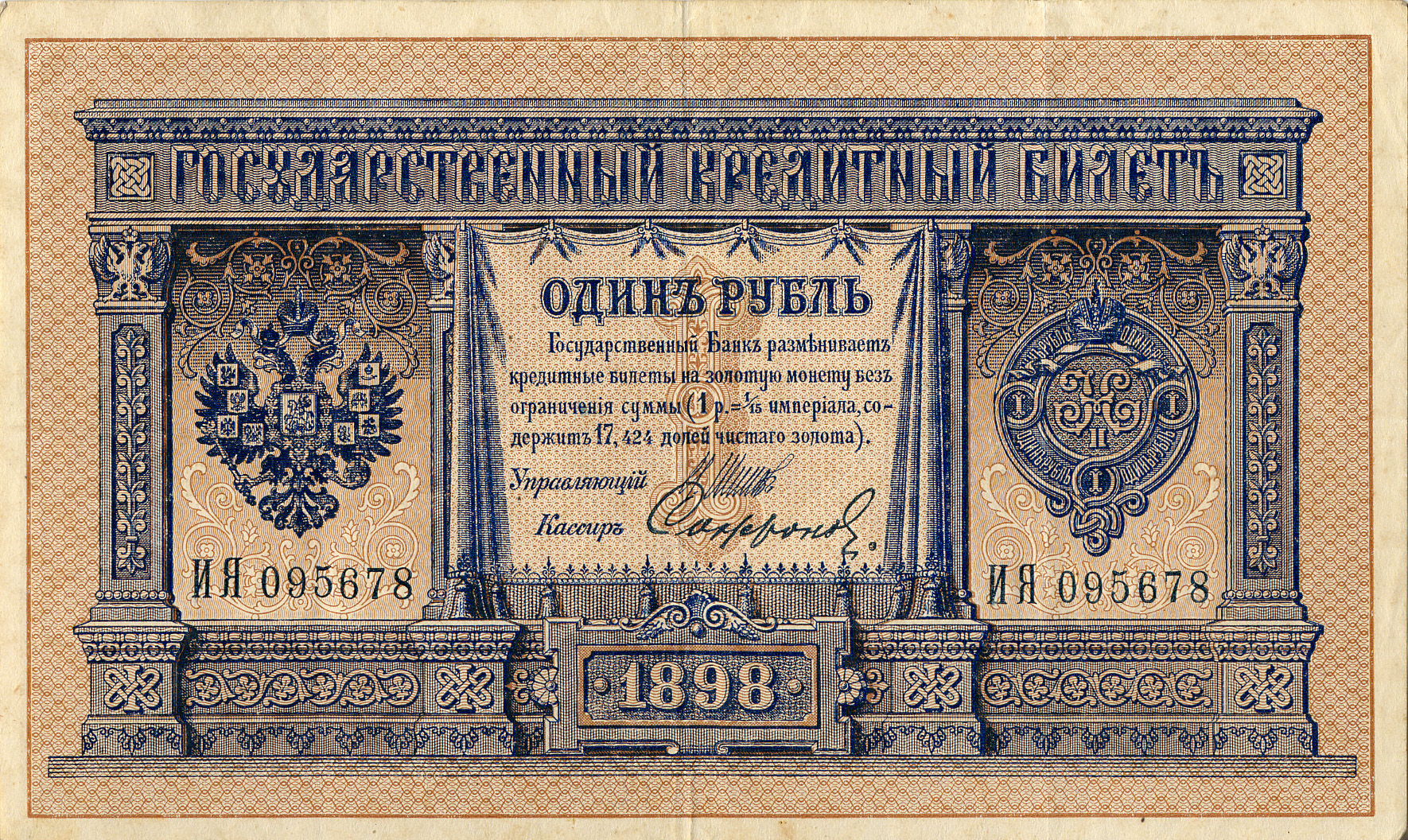
1898 Russian Empire one ruble note, obverse, stating its gold equivalence 17.424 dolya or 0.77424 gram

In 1704, Peter the Great finally reformed the old Russian monetary system, minting a silver ruble coin of weight 28.1 g (0.90 ozt) and 72% fineness; hence 20.22 g fine silver. (Note: Gross weight 433 grains, net weight 312.1 grains, hence fineness 72%. Source does not give 1704 Ukase anywhere in the book?) The decision to subdivide it primarily into 100 copper kopecks, rather than 200 Moscow denga, made the Russian ruble the world's first decimal currency.

The amount of silver in a ruble varied in the 18th century. Additionally, coins worth over a ruble were minted in gold and platinum. By the end of the 18th century, the ruble was set to 4 zolotnik 21 dolya (or 4 21/96 zolotnik, almost exactly equal to 18 grams) of pure silver or 27 dolya (almost exactly equal to 1.2 g (0.039 ozt)) of pure gold, with a ratio of 15:1 for the values of the two metals. In 1828, platinum coins were introduced with 1 ruble equal to 77 2/3 dolya (3.451 grams).

On 17 December 1885, a new standard was adopted which did not change the silver ruble but reduced the gold content to 1.161 grams, pegging the gold ruble to the French franc at a rate of 1 ruble = 4 francs. This rate was revised in 1897 to 1 ruble = 2 2/3 francs (17.424 dolya or 0.77424 g fine gold). This ruble was worth about US$0.5145 in 1914.

With the outbreak of World War I, the gold standard peg was dropped and the ruble fell in value, suffering from hyperinflation in the early 1920s. With the founding of the Soviet Union in 1922, the Russian ruble was replaced by the Soviet ruble. The pre-revolutionary Chervonetz was temporarily brought back into circulation from 1922 to 1925.

==== Imperial ruble coins ====
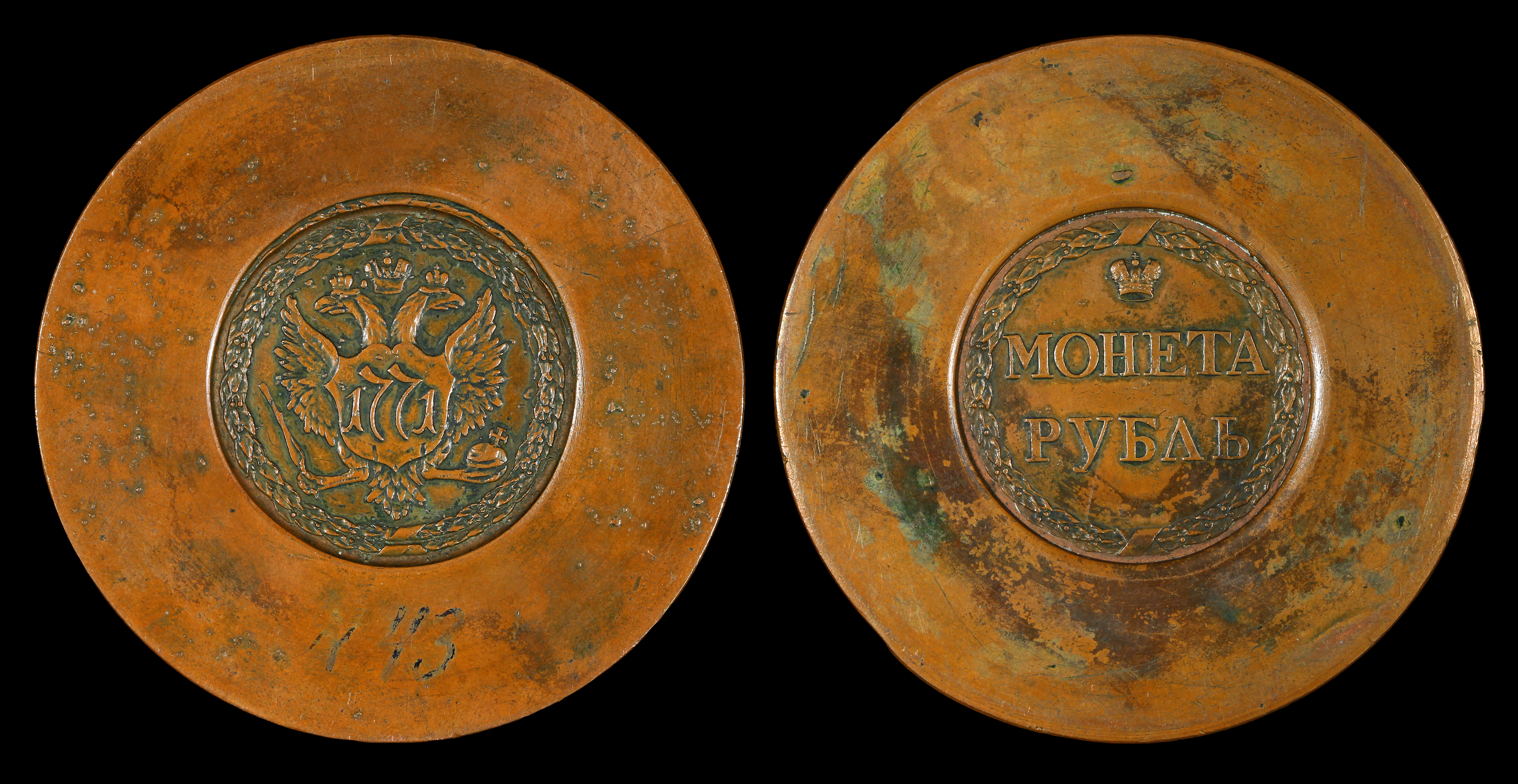
Catherine II Sestroretsk ruble (1771) is made of solid copper with a diameter of 77 millimetres (3 3/100 in) and a thickness of 26 millimetres (1 1/50 in) with a weight of 1.022 kg (2.25 lb). It is the largest copper coin ever issued (except for the Swedish plate money). It is 1mm larger and thicker than a standard hockey puck.

By the beginning of the 19th century, copper coins were issued for 1/4, 1/2, 1, 2 and 5 kopecks, with silver 5, 10, 25 and 50 kopecks and 1 ruble and gold 5, although production of the 10 ruble coin ceased in 1806. Silver 20 kopecks were introduced in 1820, followed by copper 10 kopecks minted between 1830 and 1839, and copper 3 kopecks introduced in 1840. Between 1828 and 1845, platinum 3, 6 and 12 rubles were issued. In 1860, silver 15 kopecks were introduced, due to the use of this denomination (equal to 1 złoty) in Poland, whilst, in 1869, gold 3 rubles were introduced.

In 1886, a new gold coinage was introduced consisting of 5 and 10 ruble coins. This was followed by another, in 1897. In addition to smaller 5 and 10 ruble coins, 7 1/2 and 15 ruble coins were issued for a single year, as these were equal in size to the previous 5 and 10 ruble coins. The gold coinage was suspended in 1911, with the other denominations produced until the First World War.

The Constantine ruble (Russian: константиновский рубль, konstantinovsky rubl') is a rare silver coin of the Russian Empire bearing the profile of Constantine, the brother of emperors Alexander I and Nicholas I. Its manufacture was being prepared at the Saint Petersburg Mint during the brief Interregnum of 1825, but it was never minted in numbers, and never circulated in public. Its existence became known in 1857 in foreign publications.

==== Imperial ruble banknotes ====
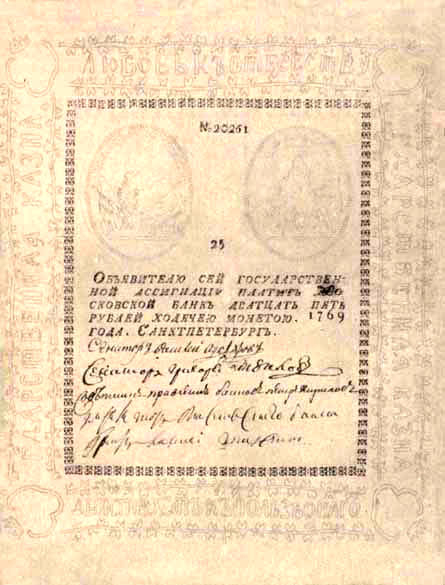
25 Assignation rubles of 1769

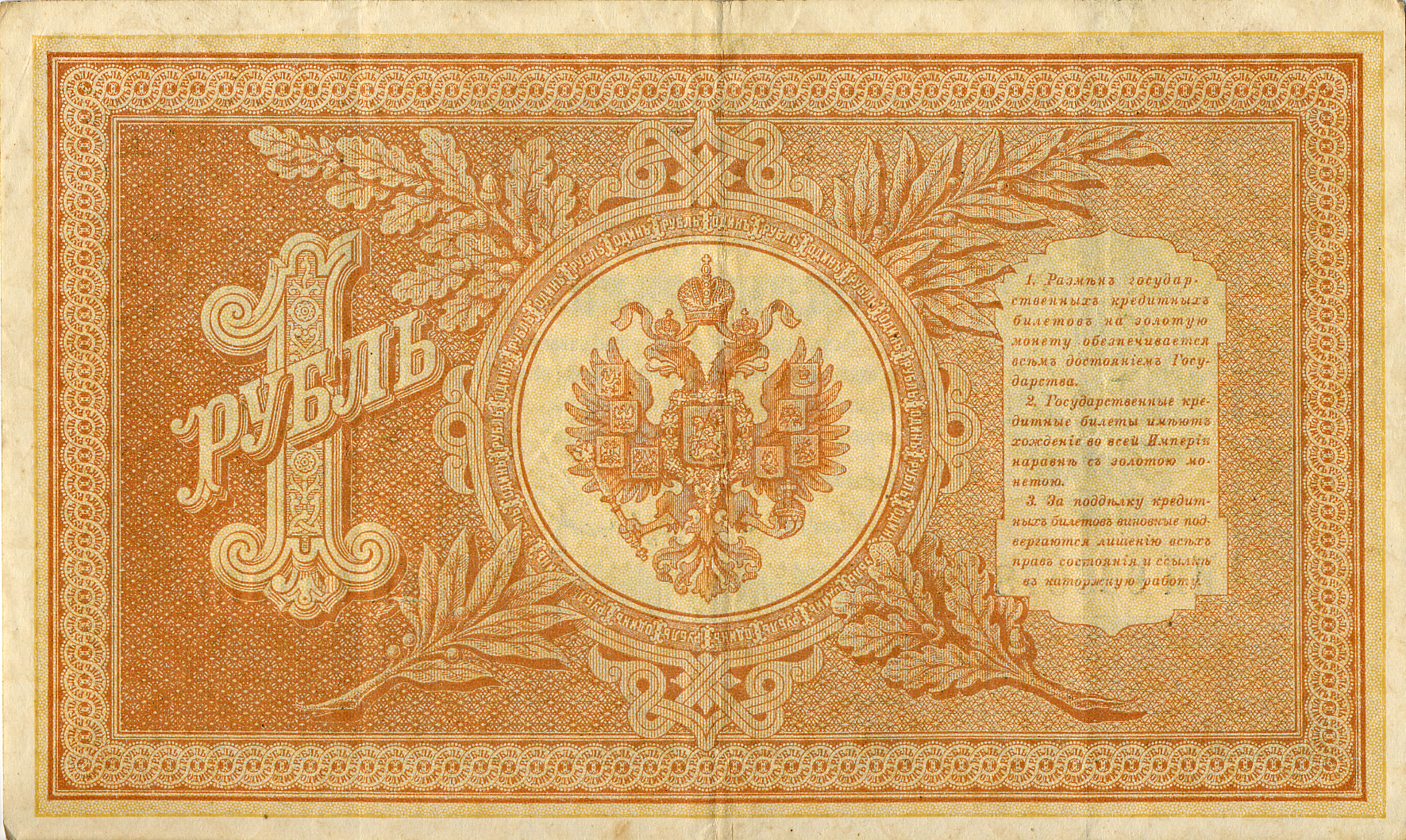
1898 Russian Empire one ruble banknote, reverse

In 1768, during the reign of Catherine the Great, the Russian Assignation Bank was instituted to issue the government paper money. It opened in Saint Petersburg and in Moscow in 1769.

In 1769, Assignation rubles were introduced for 25, 50, 75 and 100 rubles, with 5 and 10 rubles added in 1787 and 200 rubles in 1819. The value of the Assignation rubles fell relative to the coins until, in 1839, the relationship was fixed at 1 silver ruble = 3 1/2 assignat rubles. In 1840, the State Commercial Bank issued 3, 5, 10, 25, 50 and 100 ruble notes, followed by 50 ruble credit notes of the Custody Treasury and State Loan Bank.

In 1843, the Assignation Bank ceased operations, and state credit notes (Russian: государственные кредитные билеты, gosudarstvenniye kreditniye bilety) were introduced in denominations of 1, 3, 5, 10, 25, 50 and 100 rubles. In 1859 a paper credit ruble was worth about nine-tenths of a silver ruble. These circulated, in various types, until the revolution, with 500 ruble notes added in 1898 and 250 and 1,000 ruble notes added in 1917. In 1915, two kinds of small change notes were issued. One, issued by the Treasury, consisted of regular style (if small) notes for 1, 2, 3, 5 and 50 kopecks. The other consisted of the designs of stamps printed onto card with text and the imperial eagle printed on the reverse. These were in denominations of 1, 2, 3, 10, 15 and 20 kopecks.

In 1917, the Provisional Government issued treasury notes for 20 and 40 rubles. These notes are known as "Kerenki" or "Kerensky rubles". The provisional government also had 25 and 1,000 ruble state credit notes printed in the United States but most were not issued.

=== Soviet ruble – SUR (1922–1992) ===
Between 1917 and 1922, the Russian ruble was replaced by the Soviet ruble (ISO 4217 code: SUR) which, issued by the State Bank of the USSR, remained the sole currency of the Soviet Union, until its breakup in 1991. Afterwards, it continued to be used in the 15 Post-Soviet states until it was replaced by new national currencies by the end of 1992, and in the Russian Federation, the Russian ruble was reintroduced by 1992. The Central Bank of Russia responded in July 1992 by setting up restrictions on the flow of credit between Russia and other states. The final collapse of the "ruble zone" began with the exchange of banknotes by the Central Bank of Russia on Russian territory at the end of 1993. As a result, other countries still in the "ruble zone" were "pushed out".

=== Ruble – RUR (1992–1998) ===
Following the dissolution of the Soviet Union in 1991, the Soviet ruble remained the currency of the Russian Federation until 1992. A new set of coins was issued in 1992 and a new set of banknotes was issued in the name of Bank of Russia in 1993. The currency replaced the Soviet ruble at par and was assigned the ISO 4217 code RUR and number 810.

Apart from Russia, the Russian ruble was used in eleven post-Soviet states, forming a "ruble zone" between 1992 and 1993. Russian ruble was used in Kyrgyzstan, Moldova and Turkmenistan until 1993, in Armenia, Azerbaijan, Belarus, Georgia, Kazakhstan and Uzbekistan until 1994, and in Tajikistan until 1995.

The ruble's exchange rate versus the U.S. dollar depreciated significantly from US$1 = 125 RUR in July 1992 to approximately US$1 = 6,000 RUR when the currency was redenominated in 1998.

==== RUR coins ====
After the fall of the Soviet Union, the Russian Federation introduced new coins in 1992 in denominations of 1, 5, 10, 20, 50, and 100 rubles. The coins depict the double-headed eagle without a crown, sceptre and globus cruciger above the legend "Банк России" ("Bank of Russia"). It is exactly the same eagle that the artist Ivan Bilibin painted after the February Revolution as the coat of arms for the Russian Republic. The 1 and 5-ruble coins were minted in brass-clad steel, the 10 and 20-ruble coins in cupro-nickel, and the 50 and 100-ruble coins were bimetallic (aluminium-bronze and cupro-nickel-zinc). In 1993, aluminium-bronze 50-ruble coins and cupro-nickel-zinc 100-ruble coins were issued, and the material of 10 and 20-ruble coins was changed to nickel-plated steel. In 1995 the material of 50-ruble coins was changed to brass-plated steel, but the coins were minted with the old date 1993. As high inflation persisted, the lowest denominations disappeared from circulation and the other denominations became rarely used.

During this period, the commemorative one-ruble coins were regularly issued continuing the specifications of prior commemorative Soviet rubles (31 mm diameter, 12.8 grams cupronickel). It is nearly identical to those of the 5-Swiss franc coin (31.45 mm, 13.2 g cupronickel), worth approx. €4.39 or US$5.09 as of August 2018. For this reason, there have been several instances of (now worthless) Soviet and Russian ruble coins being used on a large scale to defraud automated vending machines in Switzerland.

==== RUR banknotes ====
In 1961, new State Treasury notes were introduced for 1, 3 and 5 rubles, along with new State Bank notes worth 10, 25, 50, and 100 rubles. In 1991, the State Bank took over production of 1, 3 and 5-ruble notes and also introduced 200, 500 and 1,000-ruble notes, although the 25-ruble note was no longer issued. In 1992, a final issue of notes was made bearing the name of the USSR before the Russian Federation introduced 5,000 and 10,000-ruble notes. These were followed by 50,000-ruble notes in 1993, 100,000 rubles in 1995 and, finally, 500,000 rubles in 1997 (dated 1995).

Since the dissolution of the Soviet Union in 1991, Russian ruble banknotes and coins have been notable for their lack of portraits, which traditionally were included under both the Tsarist and Communist regimes. With the issue of the 500-ruble note depicting a statue of Peter I and then the 1,000-ruble note depicting a statue of Yaroslav, the lack of recognizable faces on the currency has been partially alleviated.

SUR and RUR series banknotes
Series	Value	Obverse	Reverse	Issuer	Languages
1961	1, 3, 5, 10, 25, 50, 100 rubles	Vladimir Lenin or views of the Moscow Kremlin	Value, and views of the Moscow Kremlin for 50 rubles or higher	USSR	multiple
1991	1, 3, 5, 10, 50, 100, 200, 500, 1,000 rubles	Vladimir Lenin or views of the Moscow Kremlin	Value, and views of the Moscow Kremlin for 50 rubles or higher	USSR	Russian
1992	50, 200, 500, 1,000, 5,000, 10,000 rubles	Vladimir Lenin or views of the Moscow Kremlin	Value, and views of the Moscow Kremlin for 50 rubles or higher	USSR for 1,000 rubles and lower; Bank of Russia for 5,000- and 10,000 rubles	Russian
1993	100, 200, 500, 1,000, 5,000, 10,000, 50,000 rubles	Moscow Kremlin with the tri-color Russian flag	Value, and views of the Moscow Kremlin for 50 rubles or higher	Bank of Russia	Russian
1995	1,000, 5,000, 10,000, 50,000, 100,000, 500,000 rubles	Same design as today's banknotes, where 1 RUB = 1,000 RUR. The 1,000 ruble note did not continue as a 1 new ruble note.		Bank of Russia	Russian

=== Ruble – RUB (1998–present) ===
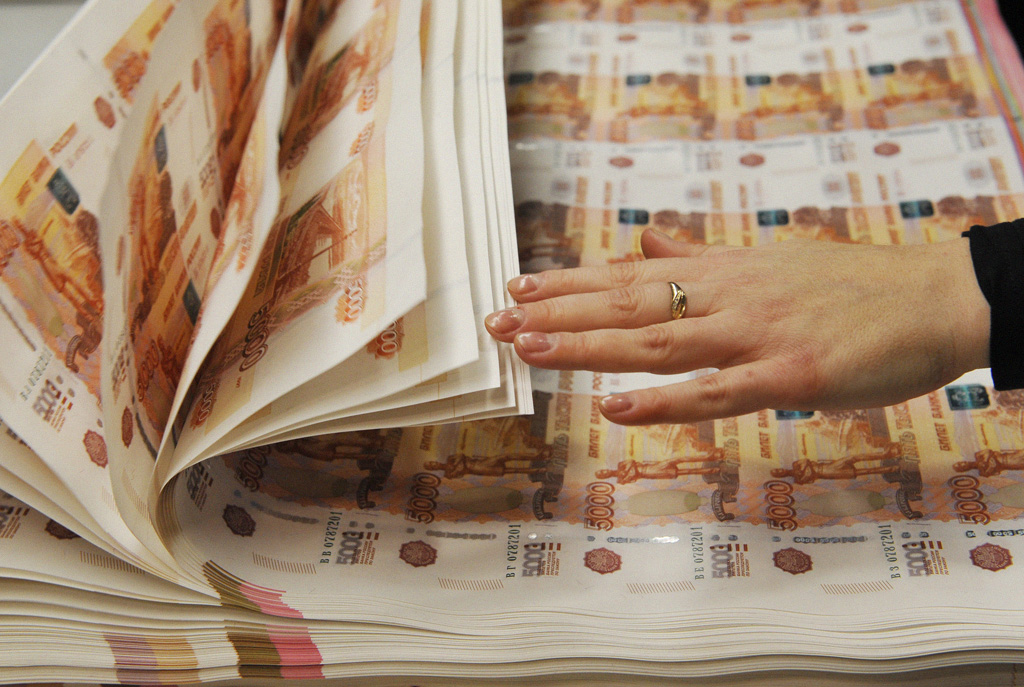
Printing of 5000 ₽ banknotes at Goznak factory in Perm in 2011

In 1998, the Russian ruble was redenominated with the new ISO 4217 code "RUB" and number 643 and was exchanged at the rate of 1 RUB = 1,000 RUR. All Soviet coins issued between 1961 and 1991, as well as 1-, 2- and 3-kopeck coins issued before 1961, also qualified for exchange into new rubles. The redenomination was an administrative step that reduced the unwieldiness of the old ruble but occurred on the brink of the 1998 Russian financial crisis. The ruble lost 70% of its value against the US dollar in the six months following this financial crisis, from US$1 = 6 ₽ to approximately 20 ₽.

After stabilizing at around US$1 = 30 ₽ from 2001 to 2013, it depreciated to the range of US$1 = 60–80 ₽ from 2014 to 2021 as a result of the annexation of Crimea by the Russian Federation in 2014 and the 2010s oil glut. After the 2022 Russian invasion of Ukraine, it declined further to US$1 = 110 ₽ due to sanctions. The ruble was subject to fluctuation when, in April 2022, the ruble went above its pre-full scale invasion level after falling as low as 150 ₽ per dollar in early March, with the longer-term trend showing a steady decline from mid-2022 to mid-2023, falling from 60 ₽ to 90 ₽ per dollar.

On 15 July 2024 the Central Bank of the Russian Federation closed the statistics of the over-the-counter currency market. On 18 November 2024, the ruble fell below the US$1 = 100 RUB, a benchmark the Russian government was attempting to maintain. By 27 November, the ruble had fallen to US$1 = 114.5 RUB, with the currency depreciating against USD and EUR at a rate of nearly 2% per day.

On 27 November 2024 in response to the currency collapse, the Bank of Russia halted formal foreign currency purchases from 28 November until year-end 2024, in "an effort to reduce the volatility on financial markets".

==== Symbol ====
The ruble sign since 2013

The "ruble" symbol used throughout the 17th century, composed of the Cyrillic letters "Р" and "У"

A currency symbol was used for the ruble between the 16th century and the 18th century. The symbol consisted of the Russian letters "Р" (rotated 90° anti-clockwise) and "У" (written on top of it). The symbol was placed over the amount number it belonged to. This symbol, however, fell into disuse by the mid-19th century.

No official symbol was used during the final years of the Empire, nor was one introduced in the Soviet Union. The abbreviations Rbl (plural: Rbls) in Latin script and руб. (Cyrillic) and the simple characters R (Latin) and р (Cyrillic) were used. These are still used today, though are unofficial.

In July 2007, the Central Bank of Russia announced that it would decide on a symbol for the ruble and would test 13 symbols. This included the symbol РР (the initials of Российский Рубль "Russian ruble"), which received preliminary approval from the Central Bank. However, one more symbol, a Р with a horizontal stroke below the top similar to the Philippine peso sign, was proposed unofficially. Proponents of the new sign claimed that it is simple, recognizable and similar to other currency signs.

On 11 December 2013, the official symbol for the ruble became, a Cyrillic letter Er with a single added horizontal stroke, though the abbreviation "руб." is in wide use. The Unicode CJK Compatibility block contains U+3354 ㍔ SQUARE RUUBURU, a square version of ルーブル (rūburu), the Japanese word for "ruble".

On 4 February 2014, the Unicode Technical Committee during its 138th meeting in San Jose accepted U+20BD ₽ RUBLE SIGN symbol for Unicode version 7.0; the symbol was then included into Unicode 7.0 released on 16 June 2014. In August 2014, Microsoft issued updates for all of its mainstream versions of Microsoft Windows that enabled support for the new ruble sign.

The ruble sign can be entered on a Russian computer keyboard as AltGr+8 on Windows and Linux, or AltGr+Р (Qwerty H position) on macOS.

==== Digital ruble ====
The digital ruble logo since 2023

In the wake of the development of cryptocurrencies, in October 2017, a draft government resolution was prepared on the technological implementation of the creation of a "cryptoruble". By October 2020, the Central Bank of the Russian Federation delivered a report on the creation of the Digital Currency of the Central Bank. It was emphasized that the Central Bank will not become a cryptocurrency, since it will be centrally issued by the Bank of Russia, which will become a guarantor of the security of settlements. Units of ruble numbers are distinctive signs of a digital code. The central bank must combine the function of non-cash and cash–it can be implemented both remotely and through an offline wallet; The digital ruble will be converted into cash and non-cash at the rate of 1:1. The report presents 4 possible models for implementing the circulation of the Central Bank of Securities, depending on who, how and to whom the wallets and several calculations are provided. At the same time, presidential press secretary Dmitry Peskov estimated the timeliness of introducing the foreign exchange ruble at 3–7 years.

In April 2021, the Central Bank of the Russian Federation reported on the current stage of the project. A model was chosen where the Bank of Russia opens and maintains wallets for financial institutions, which, in turn, open and maintain wallets for clients. By the end of 2021, it was planned to create a platform where testing of the digital ruble should begin next year. In June 2021, the Central Bank identified 12 banks that will take part in testing ruble blocks in January 2022: Ak Bars Bank, Alfa-Bank, Bank DOM.RF, VTB Bank, Gazprombank, Tinkoff Bank, Promsvyazbank, Rosbank, Sberbank, SKB- Bank, Bank SOYUZ, Bank TKB.

Testing began on 19 January 2022. On 15 February 2022, the Bank of Russia and market participants began testing the digital ruble platform and successfully carried out the first transfers in digital rubles between citizens; in the future they plan to test payment for goods and services using it. At a press conference held on 16 September 2022, Elvira Nabiullina, Director of the Bank of Russia, announced the start date for testing the digital ruble with real clients on 1 April 2023. Digital rubles were officially launched on 15 August 2023.

On 20 June 2023, the State Duma approved a bill recognizing digital currency as an object of agreement, property and inheritance, and on 11 July, in the second and third readings, it adopted a law on the implementation of the digital ruble. The law was signed by the President of Russia on 24 July 2023.

== Coins ==
In 1998, the following coins were introduced in connection with the ruble revaluation and are currently in circulation:

Currently circulating coins
Image		Value	Technical parameters			Description			Years of minting
Reverse	Obverse	Value	Diameter	Mass	Composition	Edge	Obverse	Reverse	Years of minting
		1 kop	15.5 mm	1.5 g	Cupronickel-steel	Plain	Saint George	Value	1997–2009; 2014, 2017, 2023, 2024–2026
		5 kop	18.5 mm	2.6 g	Cupronickel-steel	Plain	Saint George	Value	1997–2009; 2014, 2017, 2023, 2024–2026
		10 kop	17.5 mm	1.95 g	Brass	Reeded	Saint George	Value	1997–2006
		10 kop	17.5 mm	1.85 g	Brass-plated steel	Plain	Saint George	Value	2006–2015, 2024–2026
		50 kop	19.5 mm	2.90 g	Brass	Reeded	Saint George	Value	1997–1999; 2002–2006
		50 kop	19.5 mm	2.75 g	Brass-plated steel	Plain	Saint George	Value	2006–2015, 2023, 2024–2026
		1 ₽	20.5 mm	3.25 g	Cupronickel	Reeded	Emblem of the Bank of Russia	Value	1997–1999; 2005–2009
		1 ₽	20.5 mm	3.00 g	Nickel-plated steel	Reeded	Emblem of the Bank of Russia	Value	2009–2015
		1 ₽	20.5 mm	3.00 g	Nickel-plated steel	Reeded	Coat of arms of Russia	Value	2016–present
		2 ₽	23 mm	5.10 g	Cupronickel	Segmented (Plain and Reeded edges)	Emblem of the Bank of Russia	Value	1997–1999; 2006–2009
		2 ₽	23 mm	5.00 g	Nickel-plated steel	Segmented (Plain and Reeded edges)	Emblem of the Bank of Russia	Value	2009–2015
		2 ₽	23 mm	5.00 g	Nickel-plated steel	Segmented (Plain and Reeded edges)	Coat of arms of Russia	Value	2016–present
		5 ₽	25 mm	6.45 g	Cupronickel-clad copper	Segmented (Plain and Reeded edges)	Emblem of the Bank of Russia	Value	1997–1998; 2008–2009
		5 ₽	25 mm	6.00 g	Nickel-plated steel	Segmented (Plain and Reeded edges)	Emblem of the Bank of Russia	Value	2009–2015
		5 ₽	25 mm	6.00 g	Nickel-plated steel	Segmented (Plain and Reeded edges)	Coat of arms of Russia	Value	2016–present
		10 ₽	22 mm	5.63 g	Brass-plated steel	Segmented (plain and reeded edges)	Emblem of the Bank of Russia	Value	2009–2013, 2015
		10 ₽	22 mm	5.63 g	Brass-plated steel	Segmented (plain and reeded edges)	Coat of arms of Russia	Value	2016–present

Kopeck coins are rarely used due to their low value and in some cases may not be accepted by stores or individuals.

These coins were issued starting in 1998, although some of them bear the year 1997. Kopeck denominations all depict St George and the Dragon, and all ruble denominations (with the exception of commemorative pieces) depict the double headed eagle. Mint marks are denoted by "СП" or "M" on kopecks and the logo of either the Saint Petersburg or Moscow mint on rubles. Since 2000, many bimetallic 10 ₽ circulating commemorative coins have been issued. These coins have a unique holographic security feature inside the "0" of the denomination 10.

In 2008, the Bank of Russia proposed withdrawing 1 and 5 kopeck coins from circulation and subsequently rounding all prices to multiples of 10 kopeks, although the proposal has not been realized yet (though characteristic "x.99" prices are treated as rounded in exchange). The Bank of Russia stopped minting one-kopeck and five-kopeck coins in 2012, and kopecks completely in 2018. The material of 1 ₽, 2 ₽ and 5 ₽ coins was switched from copper-nickel-zinc and copper-nickel clad to nickel-plated steel in the second quarter of 2009. 10 and 50 kopecks were also changed from brass to brass-plated steel.

In October 2009, a new 10 ₽ coin made of brass-plated steel was issued, featuring optical security features. The 10 ₽ banknote would have been withdrawn in 2012, but a shortage of 10 ₽ coins prompted the Central Bank to delay this and put new ones in circulation. A series of circulating Olympic commemorative 25 ₽ coins started in 2011. The new coins are struck in cupronickel. A number of commemorative smaller denominations of these coins exist in circulation as well, depicting national historic events and anniversaries. The Bank of Russia issues other commemorative non-circulating coins ranging from 1 ₽ to 50,000 ₽.

== Banknotes ==
On 1 January 1998, a new series of banknotes dated 1997 was released in denominations of 5 ₽, 10 ₽, 50 ₽, 100 ₽ and 500 ₽. The 1,000 ₽ banknote was first issued on 1 January 2001 and the 5,000 ₽ banknote was first issued on 31 July 2006. Modifications to the series were made in 2001, 2004, and 2010.

In April 2016, the Central Bank of Russia announced that it will introduce two new banknotes – 200 ₽ and 2,000 ₽ – in 2017. In September 2016, a vote was held to decide which symbols and cities will be displayed on the new notes. In February 2017, the Central Bank of Russia announced the new symbols. The 200 ₽ banknote will feature symbols of Crimea, that the country illegally annexed from Ukraine in 2014: the Monument to the Sunken Ships, a view of Sevastopol, and a view of Chersonesus. The 2,000 ₽ banknote will bear images of the Russian Far East: the bridge to Russky Island and the Vostochny Cosmodrome in the Amur Oblast.

In 2018, the Central Bank issued a 100 ₽ "commemorative" banknote designed to recognize Russia's role as the host of the 2018 World Cup soccer tournament. The banknote is printed on a polymer substrate, and has several transparent portions as well as a hologram. Despite the note being intended for legal tender transactions, the Central Bank has simultaneously refused to allow the country's automated teller machines (ATMs) to recognize or accept it.

In March 2021, the Central Bank announced plans to gradually update the designs of the 10 ₽, 50 ₽, 100 ₽, 1,000 ₽ and 5,000 ₽ banknotes and make them more secure; this is expected to be completed in 2028 (originally 2025). The first new design, for the 100 ₽ note, was unveiled on 30 June 2022. The design of the new note includes symbols of Moscow on the obverse – Red Square, Zaryadye Park, Moscow State University on Sparrow Hills, and Ostankino Tower – and the Rzhev Memorial to the Soviet Soldier on the reverse. In late 2022, the Central Bank resumed the printing of 5 ₽ and 10 ₽ notes for circulation; freshly printed notes began appearing in 2023. Later, the 5,000 ₽ was also issued on 16 October 2023, 1,000 ₽ on 26 December 2025, while the 50 ₽ is expected to be issued in 2027, and the 10 ₽ with 500 ₽ in 2028.

On July 10, 2026, the Central Bank of Russia issued a new 100 Ruble-note with the map of Russia changed to just to the map of the Central Federal District.

1997 series
Image		Value	Dimensions	Description				Dates			
Obverse	Reverse	Value	Dimensions	Town	Obverse	Reverse	Watermark	Printing*	Issue	Withdrawal	Lapse
		5 ₽	137 × 61 mm	Veliky Novgorod	The Millennium of Russia monument on background of Saint Sophia Cathedral	Fortress wall of the Novgorod Kremlin	"5", Saint Sophia Cathedral	1997, 2022	1 January 1998 25 July 2022-2025	Current, but not issued from 2001 until 2021. Re-issued in 2022. Rarely seen in circulation. Returned to circulation in 2023.	
		10 ₽	150 × 65 mm	Krasnoyarsk	Kommunalny Bridge across the Yenisei River, Paraskeva Pyatnitsa Chapel	Krasnoyarsk hydroelectric plant	"10", Paraskeva Pyatnitsa Chapel	1997	1 January 1998	Current, but not issued from 2010 to 2021. Re-issued in 2022. Still in use, but rarely seen in circulation. Returned to circulation in 2023.	
		10 ₽	150 × 65 mm	Krasnoyarsk	Kommunalny Bridge across the Yenisei River, Paraskeva Pyatnitsa Chapel	Krasnoyarsk hydroelectric plant	"10", Paraskeva Pyatnitsa Chapel	2001	1 January 2001	Current, but not issued from 2010 to 2021. Re-issued in 2022. Still in use, but rarely seen in circulation. Returned to circulation in 2023.	
		10 ₽	150 × 65 mm	Krasnoyarsk	Kommunalny Bridge across the Yenisei River, Paraskeva Pyatnitsa Chapel	Krasnoyarsk hydroelectric plant	"10", Paraskeva Pyatnitsa Chapel	2004	16 August 2004	Current, but not issued from 2010 to 2021. Re-issued in 2022. Still in use, but rarely seen in circulation. Returned to circulation in 2023.	
		50 ₽	150 × 65 mm	Saint Petersburg	A Rostral Column sculpture on background of Peter and Paul Fortress	Old Saint Petersburg Stock Exchange and Rostral Columns	"50", Peter and Paul Cathedral	1997	1 January 1998	Current	
		50 ₽	150 × 65 mm	Saint Petersburg	A Rostral Column sculpture on background of Peter and Paul Fortress	Old Saint Petersburg Stock Exchange and Rostral Columns	"50", Peter and Paul Cathedral	2001	1 January 2001	Current	
		50 ₽	150 × 65 mm	Saint Petersburg	A Rostral Column sculpture on background of Peter and Paul Fortress	Old Saint Petersburg Stock Exchange and Rostral Columns	"50", Peter and Paul Cathedral	2004	16 August 2004	Current	
		100 ₽	150 × 65 mm	Moscow	Quadriga statue on the portico of the Bolshoi Theatre	The Bolshoi Theatre	"100", The Bolshoi Theatre	1997	1 January 1998	Current	
		100 ₽	150 × 65 mm	Moscow	Quadriga statue on the portico of the Bolshoi Theatre	The Bolshoi Theatre	"100", The Bolshoi Theatre	2001	1 January 2001	Current	
		100 ₽	150 × 65 mm	Moscow	Quadriga statue on the portico of the Bolshoi Theatre	The Bolshoi Theatre	"100", The Bolshoi Theatre	2004	16 August 2004	Current	
		500 ₽	150 × 65 mm	Arkhangelsk	Monument to Czar Peter the Great, sailing ship and sea terminal	Solovetsky Monastery	"500", portrait of Peter the Great	1997	1 January 1998	Current	
		500 ₽	150 × 65 mm	Arkhangelsk	Monument to Czar Peter the Great, sailing ship and sea terminal	Solovetsky Monastery	"500", portrait of Peter the Great	2001	1 January 2001	Current	
		500 ₽	150 × 65 mm	Arkhangelsk	Monument to Czar Peter the Great, sailing ship and sea terminal	Solovetsky Monastery	"500", portrait of Peter the Great	2004	16 August 2004	Current	
		500 ₽	150 × 65 mm	Arkhangelsk	Monument to Czar Peter the Great, sailing ship and sea terminal	Solovetsky Monastery	"500", portrait of Peter the Great	2010	6 September 2011	Current	
		1,000 ₽	157 × 69 mm	Yaroslavl	Monument to Yaroslav I the Wise and the Lady of Kazan Chapel	John the Baptist Church	"1,000", portrait of Yaroslav the Wise	2001	1 January 2001	Current	
		1,000 ₽	157 × 69 mm	Yaroslavl	Monument to Yaroslav I the Wise and the Lady of Kazan Chapel	John the Baptist Church	"1,000", portrait of Yaroslav the Wise	2004	16 August 2004	Current	
		1,000 ₽	157 × 69 mm	Yaroslavl	Monument to Yaroslav I the Wise and the Lady of Kazan Chapel	John the Baptist Church	"1,000", portrait of Yaroslav the Wise	2010	10 August 2010	Current	
		5,000 ₽	157 × 69 mm	Khabarovsk	Monument to Nikolay Muravyov-Amursky	Khabarovsk Bridge over the Amur	"5,000", portrait of Muravyov-Amursky	2006	31 July 2006	Current	
		5,000 ₽	157 × 69 mm	Khabarovsk	Monument to Nikolay Muravyov-Amursky	Khabarovsk Bridge over the Amur	"5,000", portrait of Muravyov-Amursky	2010	6 September 2011	Current	
These images are to scale at 0.7 pixel per millimetre (18 pixel per inch). For table standards, see the banknote specification table.: Each new banknote series has enhanced security features, but no major design changes. Banknotes printed after 1997 bear the fine print "модификация 2001г." (or later date) meaning "modification of year 2001" on the left watermark area.

2017–2028 series
Image		Value	Dimensions	Description				Date of		
Obverse	Reverse	Value	Dimensions	Federal District	Obverse	Reverse	Watermark	Printing	Issue	Withdrawal
		10 ₽	150 × 65 mm	Siberian Federal District	Novosibirsk		"10"	2028 (originally 2025)		Current
		50 ₽	150 × 65 mm	Northwestern Federal District	Saint Petersburg		"50"	2027 (originally 2025)		Current
		100 ₽	150 × 65 mm	Central Federal District	Moscow: Spasskaya Tower, Zaryadye Park, Moscow State University, Ostankino Tower	Memorial to the Soviet Soldier, Rzhev, Tver Oblast; Kulikovo Field, Tula Oblast, map of Russia	"100", Spasskaya Tower	2022	30 June 2022	Current
		100 ₽	150 × 65 mm	Central Federal District	Moscow: Spasskaya Tower, Zaryadye Park, Moscow State University, Ostankino Tower	Memorial to the Soviet Soldier, Rzhev, Tver Oblast; Kulikovo Field, Tula Oblast, map of the Central Federal District	"100", Spasskaya Tower	2026	10 July 2026	Current
		200 ₽	150 × 65 mm	Southern Federal District (Note: Internationally recognized as Ukrainian territory occupied by Russia. De jure status of Sevastopol is Ukrainian city with special status and Chersonesus part of Autonomous Republic of Crimea. (see Political status of Crimea))	Monument to the Sunken Ships (by sculptor Amandus Adamson), Sevastopol	View of Chersonesus	"200", Monument to the Sunken Ships	2017	12 October 2017	Current
		500 ₽	150 × 65 mm	North Caucasian Federal District	Pyatigorsk		"500"	2028 (originally 2024)		Current
		1,000 ₽	157 × 69 mm	Volga Federal District	Nizhny Novgorod: Nikolskaya Tower of the Nizhny Novgorod Kremlin, Nizhny Novgorod Fair, Spit of Nizhny Novgorod, Nizhny Novgorod Stadium	Saratov Bridge across the Volga River, Meteor, Agricultural Palace in Kazan	"1000", Nikolskaya Tower of the Nizhny Novgorod Kremlin	2025 (originally 2023)	26 December 2025	Current
		2,000 ₽	157 × 69 mm	Far Eastern Federal District	Vladivostok: Russky Bridge, Far Eastern Federal University	Vostochny Cosmodrome, Tsiolkovsky, Amur Oblast	"2000", Russky Bridge	2017	12 October 2017	Current
		5,000 ₽	157 × 69 mm	Ural Federal District	Yekaterinburg: Stele "Europe – Asia", Iset Tower in Yekaterinburg-City, Vysotsky, Yekaterinburg Circus, House of Communications (main post office building), Palace of Sporting Games, Sevastyanov's House	Monument "Tale of the Urals" in Chelyabinsk, metallurgical plant, stele "66 parallel" (Arctic Circle) in Salekhard, oil and gas industry facilities	"5000", House of Communications (main post office building), Sevastyanov's House	2023	16 October 2023	Current

For the rest of the 2017–2028 series, the following designs are planned:

- 10 ₽ (2028, originally 2025): Novosibirsk on the obverse, Siberian Federal District on the reverse
- 50 ₽ (2027, originally 2025): Saint Petersburg on the obverse, Northwestern Federal District on the reverse
- 500 ₽ (2028, originally 2024): Pyatigorsk on the obverse, North Caucasian Federal District on the reverse.

=== Printing ===
QR codes from the current (2017–present) series of banknotes

All Russian ruble banknotes are currently printed at the state-owned factory Goznak in Moscow, which was founded on 6 June 1919 and operated ever since. Coins are minted in the Moscow Mint and at the Saint Petersburg Mint, which has been operating since 1724.

=== 100 ₽ note controversy ===
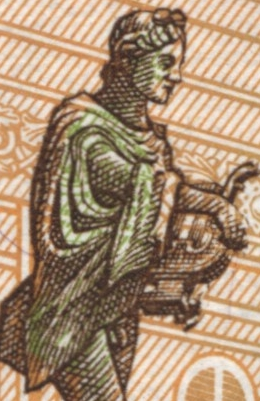
An image of the 100-ruble banknote, zoomed up to show a statue of the Greek god Apollo as depicted on top of the Bolshoi Theatre in Moscow; this version of Apollo is shown with his penis and testicles exposed (which was the case on the Bolshoi Theatre at the time of printing, though the original statue was amended with a fig leaf covering them) which led to one Russian politician, Roman Khudyakov, to condemn the banknote as "pornography".

On 8 July 2014, State Duma deputy and vice-chairman of the Duma Regional Political Committee Roman Khudyakov alleged that the image of the Greek god Apollo driving a quadriga on the portico of the Bolshoi Theatre in Moscow on the 100 ₽ banknote constitutes pornography that should only be available to persons over the age of 18. Since it is impractical to limit the access of minors to banknotes, he requested in his letter to the Governor of the Bank of Russia Elvira Nabiullina to immediately change the design of the banknote.

Khudyakov, a member of parliament for the LDPR party stated, "You can clearly see that Apollo is naked, you can see his genitalia. I submitted a parliamentary request and forwarded it directly to the head of the central bank asking for the banknote to be brought into line with the law protecting children and to remove this Apollo." Khudyakov's efforts did not lead to any changes being made to the design.

=== Crimea controversy ===
On 13 October 2017, the National Bank of Ukraine issued a decree forbidding the country's banks, other financial institutions and Ukraine's state postal service to circulate Russian banknotes which use images of Crimea, a territory that is Russian-occupied and whose annexation by Russia is not recognised by most UN member states. The NBU stated that the ban applies to all financial operations, including cash transactions, currency exchange activities and interbank trade. Crimea is featured on three banknotes that are currently in circulation – the 100 ₽ commemorative notes issued in 2015 and 2018, as well as the 200 ₽ note issued in 2017.

=== 1,000 ₽ note controversy ===
On 16 October 2023, the day of unveilling of the new design of the 1,000-ruble note, the design of the note was criticised by the Russian Orthodox Church for displaying the Islamic crescent on one of the buildings on the reverse of the note at the same time as excluding the Orthodox cross from a different building (a former church that is now a museum). The Bank of Russia announced on the following day that the design would be revised and the notes would not be printed. The updated note was issued on 26 December 2025, with the obverse the same as the 2023 version, but the reverse was changed to Saratov Bridge across the Volga River, the Meteor and the Agricultural Palace in Kazan.

=== Effect of international sanctions ===
Kommersant reported that the new 100 ₽ note introduced in 2022 will not work with an estimated 60% of cash registers and bank machines because they are imported and therefore must be updated by foreign companies, and this work may not be completed due to sanctions. However, Russian banks have been transferring their ATM networks to domestic software which does not require foreign specialists since at least 2018, with the biggest Russian bank, Sberbank, completing 80% of the transfer by June 2022. Russian banks will start purchasing domestic ATMs with Elbrus processors in 2023; the mandatory share of Russian products in the purchase of ATMs was to be at least 18% for banks with state partnership; since 2022 it has grown to 20%.

=== Commemorative banknotes ===
Commemorative banknote series
Image		Value	Dimensions	Description			Dates			
Obverse	Reverse	Value	Dimensions	Obverse	Reverse	Watermark	Printing*	Issue	Withdrawal	Lapse
		100 ₽	150 × 65 mm	A snowboarder and some of the Olympic venues of the Sochi coastal cluster.	Fisht Olympic Stadium in Sochi, firebird	2014 Winter Olympics logo	2014	30 October 2013	Current	
		100 ₽	150 × 65 mm	Monument to the Sunken Ships in Sevastopol Bay, outlines of Monument to the heroes of the Second Siege of Sevastopol and St. Vladimir Cathedral, fragment of a painting by Ivan Aivazovsky	Swallow's Nest castle, Yevpatoria RT-70 radio telescope, outline of Big Khan Mosque in Bakhchisaray and a green stripe containing a QR code linking to the Bank of Russia webpage containing historical information relating to the commemorative banknote	Portrait of Empress Catherine the Great	2015	23 December 2015	Current	
		100 ₽	150 × 65 mm	A boy with a ball under his arm looking up as Lev Yashin saves a ball.	A stylized image of the globe in the form of a football with a green image of Russia's territory (including Crimea) outlined on it, as well as the name of the 2018 FIFA World Cup host cities	The number 2018	2018	22 May 2018	Current	

On 30 October 2013, a special banknote in honour of the 2014 Winter Olympics held in Sochi was issued. The banknote is printed on high-quality white cotton paper. A transparent polymer security stripe is embedded into the paper to make a transparent window incorporating an optically variable element in the form of a snowflake. The highlight watermark is visible in the upper part of the banknote. Ornamental designs run vertically along the banknote. The front of the note features a snowboarder and some of the Olympic venues of the Sochi coastal cluster. The back of the note features the Fisht Olympic Stadium in Sochi. The predominant colour of the note is blue.

On 23 December 2015, another commemorative 100 ₽ banknote was issued to celebrate the "reunification of Crimea and Russia". The banknote is printed on light yellow cotton paper. One side of the note is devoted to Sevastopol, the other one – to Crimea. А wide security thread is embedded into the paper. It comes out on the surface on the Sevastopol side of the banknote in the figure-shaped window. A multitone combined watermark is located on the unprinted area in the upper part of the banknote. Ornamental designs run vertically along the banknote. The Sevastopol side of the note features the Monument to Sunken Ships in Sevastopol Bay and a fragment of the painting Russian Squadron on the Roads of Sevastopol by Ivan Aivazovsky. The Crimea side of the note features the Swallow's Nest, a decorative castle and local landmark. In the lower part of the Sevastopol side of the banknote in the green stripe there is a QR-code containing a link to the Bank of Russia's webpage, which lists historical information related to the banknote. The predominant colour of the note is olive green.

On 22 May 2018, a special banknote to celebrate the 2018 FIFA World Cup was issued. The banknote is printed on polymer. The top part of the note bears a transparent window that contains a holographic element. The design of the note is vertically oriented. The main images of the obverse are a boy with a ball under his arm and a goalkeeper diving for a ball. The main image of the reverse is a stylized image of the globe in the form of a football with green image of the Russian territory outlined on it. On the reverse there is the number 2018 that marks both the issue of the banknote and the World Cup, as well as the name of the host cities in the Russian language. The bottom right corner of the obverse bears a QR-code, which contains a link to the page of the Bank of Russia website with the description of the note's security features. Predominant colours of the note are blue and green.

== Economics ==
Worldwide official use of foreign currency or pegs. The ruble is used in Russia and Russian occupied territories of Georgia and Ukraine. Russian ruble users, including the Russian Federation US dollar users, including the United States Currencies pegged to the US dollar Euro users, including the eurozone Currencies pegged to the euro Australian dollar users, including Australia New Zealand dollar users, including New Zealand South African rand users (CMA, including South Africa) Indian rupee users and pegs, including India Pound sterling users and pegs, including the United Kingdom Special drawing rights or other currency basket pegs Three cases of a country using or pegging the currency of a neighbour

The use of other currencies for transactions between Russian residents is punishable, with a few exceptions, with a fine of 75% to 100% of the value of the transaction.

=== International trade ===
On 23 November 2010, at a meeting of Russian Prime Minister Vladimir Putin and Chinese Premier Wen Jiabao, it was announced that Russia and China had decided to use their own national currencies for bilateral trade, instead of the US dollar. The move is aimed to further improve relations between Beijing and Moscow and to protect their domestic economies during the Great Recession. The trading of the Chinese yuan against the ruble has started in the Chinese interbank market, while the yuan's trading against the ruble was set to start on the Russian foreign exchange market in December 2010.

In January 2014, President Putin said there should be a sound balance on the ruble exchange rate; that the Central Bank only regulated the national currency exchange rate when it went beyond the upper or lower limits of the floating exchange rate; and that the freer the Russian national currency is, the better it is, adding that this would make the economy react more effectively and timely to processes taking place in it. The Russian ruble is one of the very few free floating currencies in the world.

Sanctions beginning in 2014 contributed to the value's reduction of the Russian ruble and worsened the economic impact of the 2022 Russian invasion of Ukraine. They also caused economic damage to the EU economy, with total losses estimated at €100 billion (as of 2015). As of 2014, Russia's finance minister announced that the sanctions had cost Russia $40 billion, with another $100 billion loss in 2014 due to decrease in the price of oil the same year. Following sanctions imposed in August 2018, economic losses incurred by Russia amounted to around 0.5–1.5% in foregone GDP growth.

A second round of sanctions involved various Russian banks being removed from SWIFT, and direct sanctions on the Russian Central Bank. The value of the ruble fell 30% against the U.S. dollar, to as low as ₽119/$1 as of 28 February 2022. The Russian central bank raised interest rates to 20% as a result. In an attempt to balance the sinking ruble, it temporarily shut down the Moscow Stock Exchange, mandated that all Russian companies sell 80% of foreign exchange reserves, and prohibited foreigners from liquidating assets in Russia. On 7 March, the ruble was reported to be as low as ₽142.46/$1. During the month of March 2022, the ruble gradually recovered back to its pre-war value of ~80 Rubles per dollar, partially due to increased gas and oil demand from Western companies, as they feared a potential ban on Russian resources, as well as various economic measures designed to prop up the currency.

=== Exchange rates ===
USD/RUB 1998–2025
Year	Lowest ↓		Highest ↑		Average
Year	Date	Rate	Date	Rate	Rate
1998	1 January	5.9600	29 December	20.9900	9.7945
1999	1 January	20.6500	29 December	27.0000	24.6489
2000	6 January	26.9000	23 February	28.8700	28.1287
2001	4 January	28.1600	18 December	30.3000	29.1753
2002	1 January	30.1372	7 December	31.8600	31.3608
2003	20 December	29.2450	9 January	31.8846	30.6719
2004	30 December	27.7487	1 January	29.4545	28.8080
2005	18 March	27.4611	6 December	28.9978	28.1910
2006	6 December	26.1840	12 January	28.4834	27.1355
2007	24 November	24.2649	13 January	26.5770	25.5808
2008	16 July	23.1255	31 December	29.3804	24.8529
2009	13 November	28.6701	19 February	36.4267	31.7403
2010	16 April	28.9310	8 June	31.7798	30.3679
2011	6 May	27.2625	5 October	32.6799	29.3823
2012	28 March	28.9468	5 June	34.0395	31.0661
2013	5 February	29.9251	5 September	33.4656	31.9063
2014	1 January	32.6587	18 December	67.7851	38.6025
2015	17 April	49.6749	31 December	72.8827	61.3400
2016	30 December	60.2730	22 January	83.5913	66.8336
2017	26 April	55.8453	4 August	60.7503	58.2982
2018	28 February	55.6717	12 September	69.9744	62.9502
2019	26 December	61.7164	15 January	67.1920	64.6184
2020	10 January	61.0548	18 March	80.8692	72.4388
2021	27 October	69.5526	8 April	77.7730	73.6628
2022	30 June	51.1580	11 March	120.3785	68.4869
2023	15 January	66.0026	8 October	101.0001	85.5086
2024	20 June	82.6282	29 November	109.5782	92.6567
2025	6 December	76.0937	15 January	103.4380	83.2108
Source: USD exchange rates in RUB, Bank of Russia

Current RUB exchange rates
From Google Finance:	AUD CAD CHF CNY EUR GBP HKD JPY USD
From Yahoo! Finance:	AUD CAD CHF CNY EUR GBP HKD JPY USD
From XE.com:	AUD CAD CHF CNY EUR GBP HKD JPY USD
From OANDA:	AUD CAD CHF CNY EUR GBP HKD JPY USD

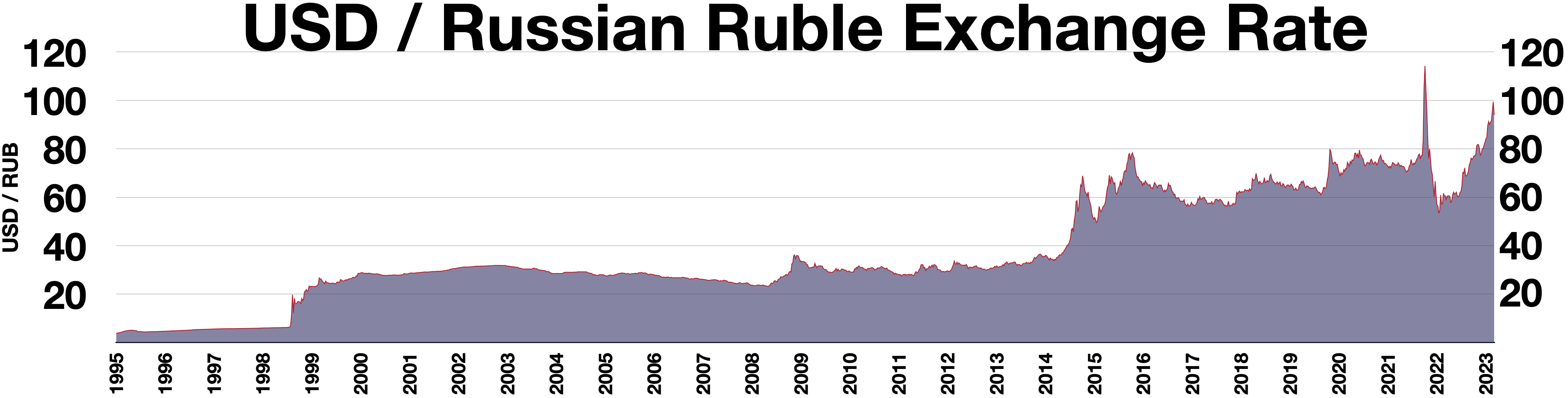
USD / RUB exchange rate 1994–2023

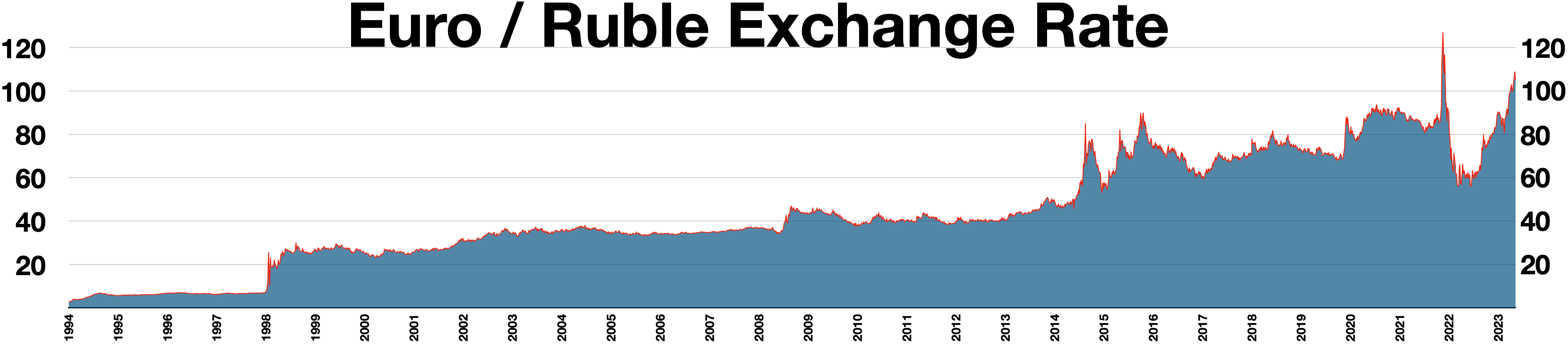
EUR / RUB exchange rate

The first Russian ruble (RUR) introduced in January 1992 depreciated significantly versus the US dollar from US$1 = 125 RUR to around US$1 = 6,000 RUR (or 6 RUB) when it was redenominated in January 1998. The new ruble then depreciated rapidly in its first year to US$1 = 20 RUB before stabilizing at around US$1 = 30 RUB from 2001 to 2013.

The financial crisis in Russia in 2014–2016 was the result of the collapse of the Russian ruble beginning in the second half of 2014. A decline in confidence in the Russian economy caused investors to sell off their Russian assets, which led to a decline in the value of the Russian ruble and sparked fears of a Russian financial crisis. The lack of confidence in the Russian economy stemmed from at least two major sources. The first is the fall in the price of oil in 2014. Crude oil, a major export of Russia, declined in price by nearly 50% between its yearly high in June 2014 and 16 December 2014. The second was the result of international economic sanctions imposed on Russia following Russia's annexation of Crimea and the Russian military intervention in Ukraine.

The crisis affected the Russian economy, both consumers and companies, and regional financial markets, as well as Putin's ambitions regarding the Eurasian Economic Union. The Russian stock market in particular experienced large declines, with a 30% drop in the RTS Index from the beginning of December through 16 December 2014. From July 2014 to February 2015 the ruble fell dramatically against the U.S. dollar. A 6.5 percentage point interest rate rise to 17 percent failed to prevent the currency hitting record lows in a "perfect storm" of low oil prices, looming recession and international sanctions over the Russo-Ukrainian War.

Russia faced steep economic sanctions due to the invasion of Ukraine in early 2022. In response to the military campaign, several countries imposed strict economic sanctions on the Russian economy. (Note: Albania, Australia, Austria, Belgium, Bulgaria, Canada, Croatia, Cyprus, Czechia, Denmark, Estonia, Finland, France, Georgia, Germany, Greece, Hungary, the Republic of Ireland, Italy, Japan, Latvia, Lithuania, Luxembourg, Malta, Montenegro, the Netherlands, New Zealand, Norway, Poland, Portugal, Romania, Slovakia, Slovenia, Spain, Sweden, Switzerland, Ukraine, the United Kingdom, the United States.) This led to a 32 percent drop in the value of the ruble, which traded at an exchange rate of 120 rubles per dollar in March 2022. On 23 March 2022, President Putin announced that Russia would only accept payments for Russian gas exports from "unfriendly countries" in rubles. This, along with several other actions to control capital flow, coinciding with soaring commodity prices led to the ruble rallying to a record high in May 2022 that economists feel is unlikely to last. However, the ruble continued to rally in June 2022, hitting its highest point (51 rubles to the dollar) for the past seven years at the end of the month.

In early November 2023, the value of the Russian ruble increased slightly reaching a three-month high of 90 against the USD. The Russian key interest rate rose to 15% in October. Capital control measures, including the mandatory FX sales for Russian exporters imposed by Moscow were also effective to support the value of the currency. On 2 November, the U.S. announced new sweeping sanctions against Russian energy exports and limits on foreign currency payments by Russia's Central Bank, which was thought to be another reason for the higher value of the ruble, forcing Russian banks to pay in ruble. Stock indices for Russian companies were also up. The ruble's overall decline is a major problem for the Russian economy as it increases inflation particularly for imported goods.

== See also ==
- Belarusian ruble
- Russian economy
- Transnistrian ruble
- Ruble (disambiguation), various historic and modern rubles.
