= Saratovsky =

Saratovsky (masculine), Saratovskaya (feminine), or Saratovskoye (neuter) may refer to:

- Saratovsky District, a district of Saratov Oblast, Russia
- Saratovsky (rural locality) (Saratovskaya, Saratovskoye), several rural localities in Russia
- Saratov Oblast (Saratovskaya oblast), a federal subject of Russia
- Saratovskoye, former name of Qyzylqayyng, a populated place in Kazakhstan
