= Russian five-ruble banknote =

Currency denomination

Five Rubles
(Russia)
- Value: 5 Russian rubles
- Width: 137 mm
- Height: 61 mm
- Security features: Shadow image
- Material used: Cotton
- Years of printing: 1998–2001, 2022–present

Obverse
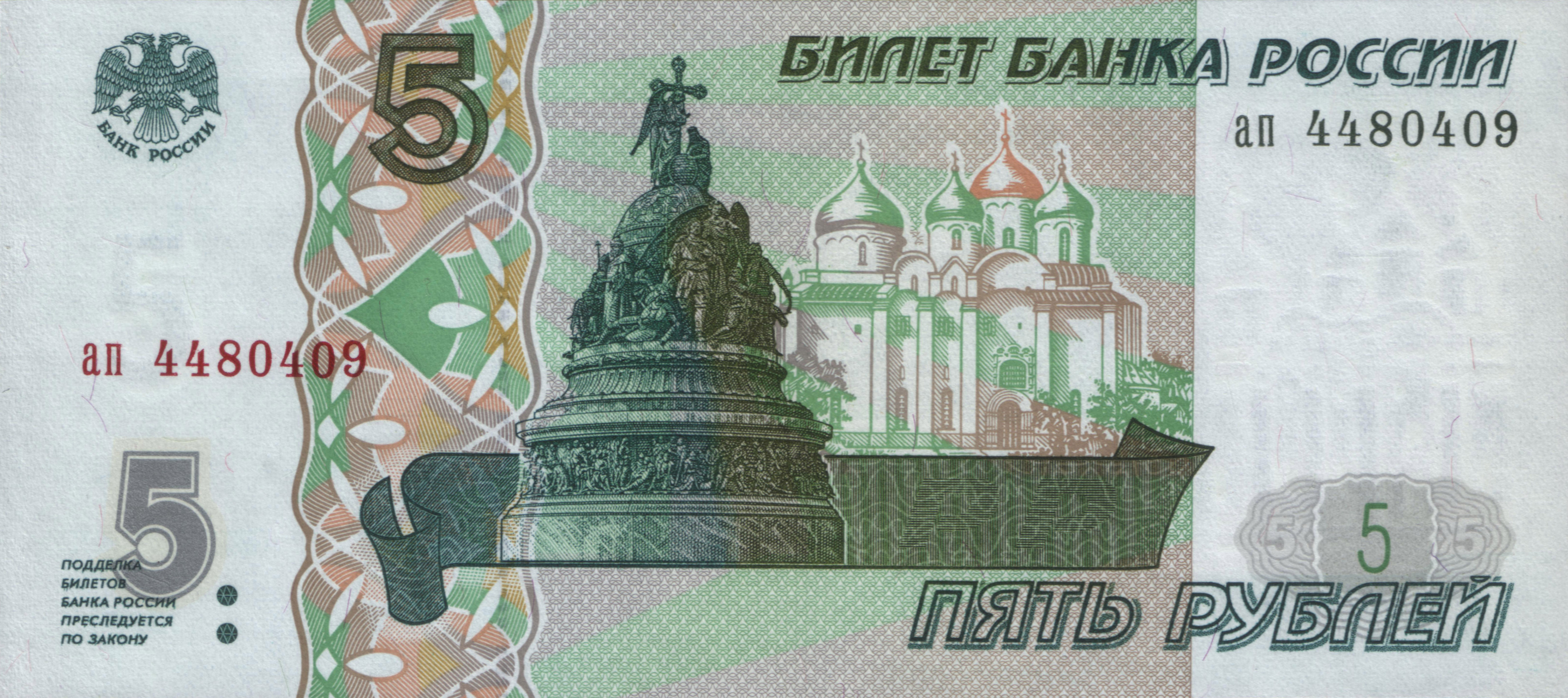
- Design: Millennium of Russia and Saint Sophia Cathedral in Novgorod

Reverse
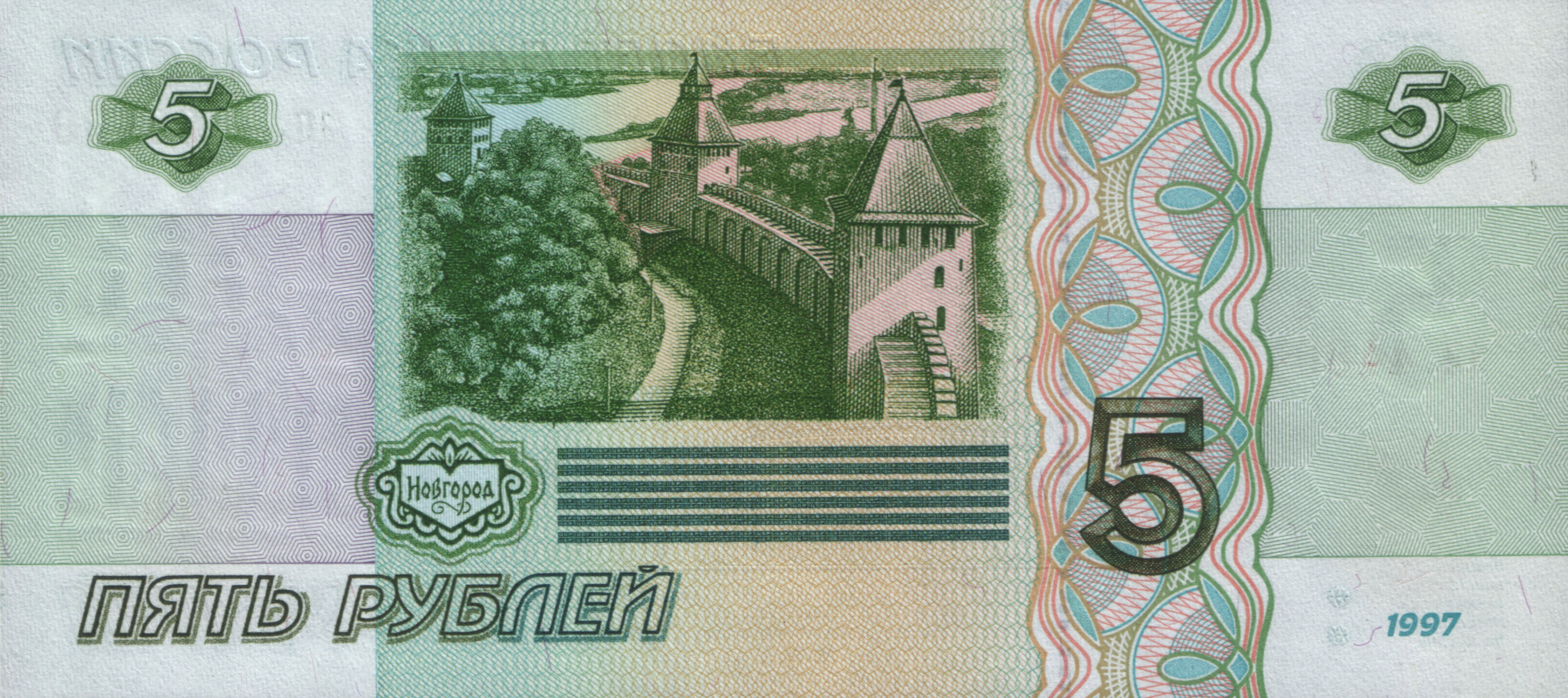
- Design: wall of the Novgorod Kremlin
- Design date

The Russian five-ruble banknote was introduced in 1998 (replacing the old 5000 ruble note) and then discontinued in 2001 because of inflation. Until 2023, five-ruble notes were very hard to find in general circulation. The most prominent color of the note is light-green in the background. In late 2022, the Central Bank of Russia announced that the bill had been reintroduced alongside the ten-ruble banknote. It was returned to circulation in January 2023.

== Design ==
The design is dedicated to the city of Veliky Novgorod. Despite the city being renamed Veliky Novgorod in 1999, the 2022 notes retain the city's former name. On the obverse is the Millennium of Russia with Saint Sophia Cathedral in Novgorod in the background. On the reverse is the fortress wall of the Novgorod Kremlin. The Volkhov River is also seen in the background above the wall.

== Security features ==
The five-ruble note has a number of security features. The note has two watermarks, the one on the left is the denomination of the bill, whilst the one on the right is Saint Sophia Cathedral in Novgorod. Both can be seen when held up to the light. A security thread runs through the banknote – when held up to the light "ЦБР 5" can be seen. The vertical banner to the left of the Millennium of Russia, is printed on both sides of the note, when held up to the light the band should be complete. Blue, red, and yellow threads are randomly distributed across the banknote. When viewed at an angle, the letters PP appear on the bottom banner. Next to the denomination in the lower left hand corner are two raised dots known as intaglio printing for the visually impaired. Under UV Light the colored threads glow.
