= Saratovsky, Zilairsky District, Republic of Bashkortostan =

Saratovsky Саратовский
- Khutor
- Location within Bashkortostan Location within Russia
- Coordinates: 52°23′N 57°13′E
- Country: Russia
- Region: Bashkortostan
- District: Zilairsky District
- Time zone: UTC+5:00

Saratovsky (Russian: Саратовский; Bashkir: Һарытау, Harıtaw) is a rural locality (a khutor) in Dmitriyevsky Selsoviet, Zilairsky District, Bashkortostan, Russia. The population was 65 as of 2010. There are 2 streets.

== Geography ==
Saratovsky is located 27 km northwest of Zilair (the district's administrative centre) by road. Dmitriyevka is the nearest rural locality.
