= Saratovsky, Kugarchinsky District, Republic of Bashkortostan =

Saratovsky Саратовский
- Khutor
- Location within Bashkortostan Location within Russia
- Coordinates: 52°34′N 56°27′E
- Country: Russia
- Region: Bashkortostan
- District: Kugarchinsky District
- Time zone: UTC+5:00

Saratovsky (Russian: Саратовский; Bashkir: Һарытау, Harıtaw) is a rural locality (a khutor) in Isimovsky Selsoviet, Kugarchinsky District, Bashkortostan, Russia. The population was 126 as of 2010. There is 1 street.

== Geography ==
Saratovsky is located 28 km southwest of Mrakovo (the district's administrative centre) by road. Yanaul is the nearest rural locality.
