= Agricultural Palace =

Building in Kazan, Russia

- Дворец земледельцев
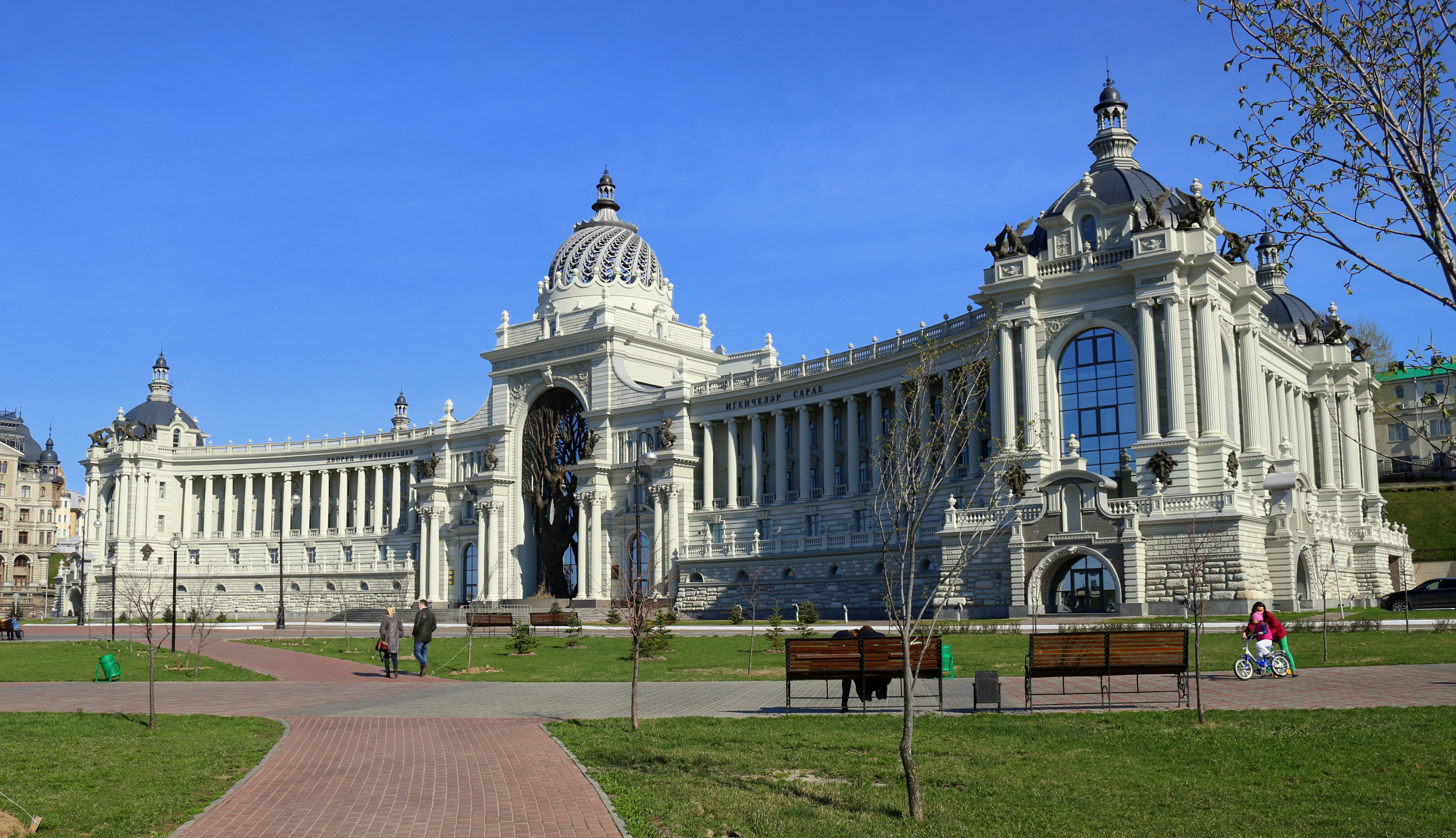
- View of the Palace from Baturina Street
- Interactive map of the Agricultural Palace area

General information
- Architectural style: Beaux-Arts
- Location: Kazan, Russia, Palace Square, Fedoseevskaya Street, 36
- Coordinates: 55.8006°N 49.1122°E
- Year built: 2008–2010

Design and construction
- Architect: Leonid Gornik
- Architecture firm: Antika-plus

Website
- https://agro.tatarstan.ru

The Agricultural Palace (Russian: Дворец земледельцев, Tatar: Игенчеләр сарае) is a building in the historic center of Kazan, Russia, in the Vakhitovsky District. It is located on Palace Square, near the northern wall of the Kazan Kremlin and the Kazanka River embankment. The building accommodates the headquarters of the Ministry of Agriculture and Food of the Republic of Tatarstan, the Chief Veterinary Office, the Republican Agro-Industrial Center for Investments and Innovations, and numerous subordinate organizations. The Palace of Farmers has become one of the city’s most notable contemporary landmarks.

== Description ==
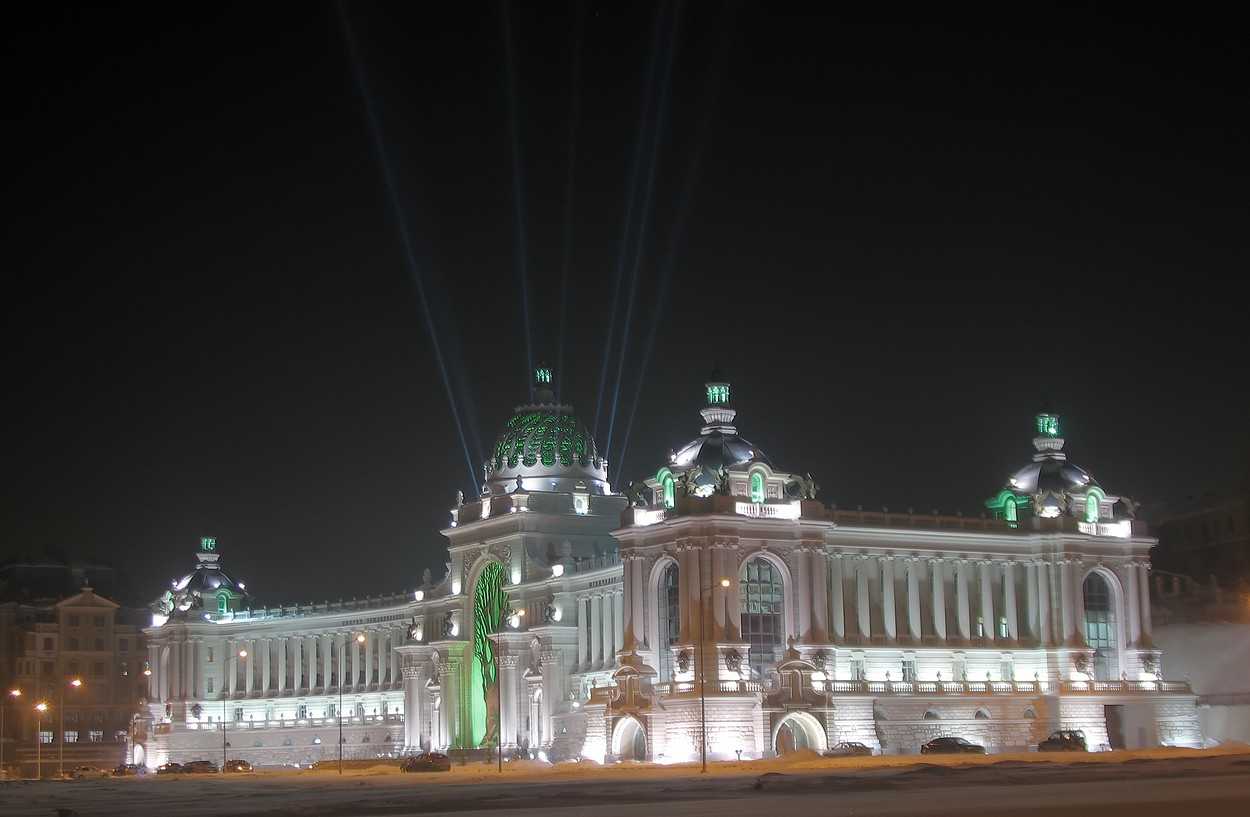
The palace being illuminated at night.

The eclectic and monumental exterior of the building, featuring two symmetrical wings with portals and a central section with a portal and a classical dome, incorporates a variety of small architectural forms. The shape of the building and its borrowings of empire and classical architectural elements are reminiscent of the Petit Palais or one of the Hofburg wings in Viennaand, viewed from the side, of the Vittoriano in Rome. The author of the project, Leonid Gornik, maintains that the building is not an exercise in eclecticism, neo-historicist, or neoclassical styles, but rather adheres to the true canons of classicism.

All of the facade's architectural elements follow directly the treatise The Rule of the Five Orders of Architecture by the Renaissance theorist Giacomo Barozzi da Vignola. The ornamentation and structural plasticity of the palace are based exclusively on two architectural orders—the Ionic and the Corinthian. The Ionic order governs the bulk of the building, while the Corinthian is reserved for the main entrance. The proportions of both orders have been observed rigorously. There is no stylistic license here—nothing ornamental or structural is arbitrarily modified; everything is executed by the rules. — Leonid Gornik

The dome has a classical silhouette but differs from traditional domes in being spiral in shape, with translucent elements. At night, the dome is illuminated with green backlighting. Initially, after the building was commissioned, powerful floodlights shone upward from beneath the dome, creating a corona effect, but over time, the lamps lost power and were later dismantled.

The top of the main facade bears the building’s name in large metal letters, in both Russian and Tatar.

The palace is located at the foot of a 15-meter-high hill. A square is laid out in front of the palace. Unlike the exterior, the interior is designed in a restrained manner, using primarily inexpensive materials. The left half of the building houses the Ministry of Agriculture and Food of the Republic of Tatarstan, while the right half houses its subordinate organizations.

At night the palace features rich architectural lighting. The central element, a 20-meter-tall tree, is made of bronze. Its green backlight symbolizes foliage. The top of the central spire rises to 48 meters.

== History ==
The palace was built on the site of dilapidated structures that once lined the old Fedoseevskaya Street. The design was carried out by the firm "Antika-Plus", with Leonid Gornik as the lead architect.

Construction began in spring 2008 and concluded in 2010. The cost of the building was approximately 2.2 billion rubles.

Since 2011, on Republic and City Day (August 30), a gala concert has been held on the square adjacent to the Palace as part of the international opera festival Kazan Autumn. The event is staged outdoors in open air and is free to the public. The inaugural concert featured Russia’s prima donna Lyubov Kazarnovskaya and the Italian tenor Leonardo Gromenya, accompanied by the State Symphony Orchestra of Tatarstan.

== Criticism ==
After its completion in 2010, the Palace drew protest from the Volga Federal District Office (the former Rosokhrankultura), which argued that placing such a building near the protected area of the Kazan Kremlin, a World Heritage Site, "violates cultural heritage protection laws and clashes with the historic and cultural environment".

Views on the Palace are sharply divided: praise and admiration on the one hand, harsh criticism on the other. It has been nominated both for awards recognizing outstanding new urban buildings and for "anti-awards". In August 2011, Kazan’s chief architect, Tatiana Prokofieva, called the building of the Ministry of Agriculture, despite the high quality of its facade finishing, stylistically inappropriate next to the Kremlin.
