= Saratov Bridge =

Bridge across the Volga River in Saratov, Russia

Coordinates: 51°30′52″N 46°04′20″E

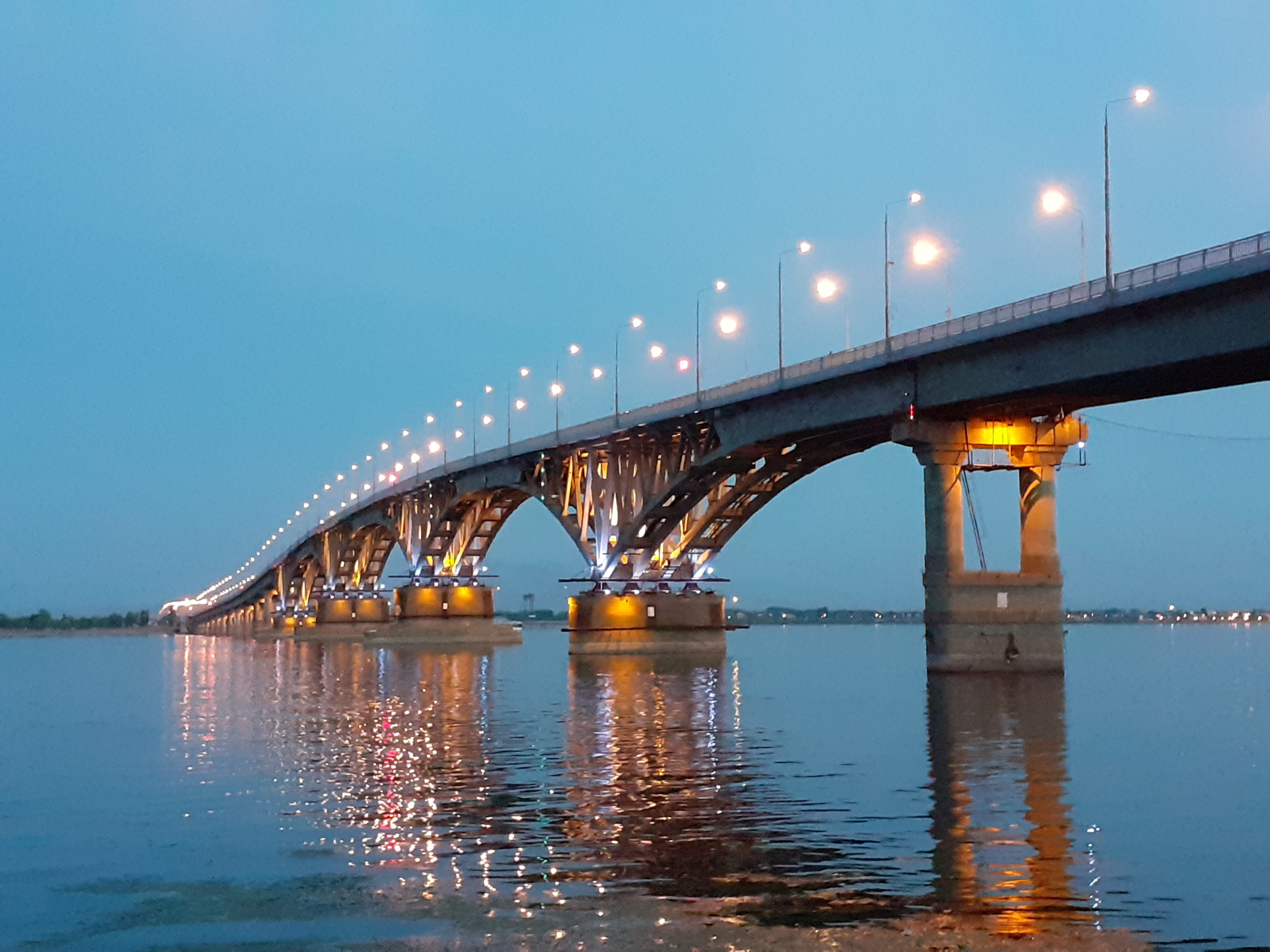
Saratov bridge used to be the longest in the Soviet Union

Saratov Bridge (Russian: Сара́товский мост, romanized: Sarátovskiy most), crossing the Volga River in Saratov, Russia was the longest bridge in the Soviet Union upon its inauguration in 1965. Its length is 2,803.7 meters (9,198 ft). It connects Saratov on the right (west) bank of the Volga, with the city of Engels on the left (east) bank.

The new bridge was built at the village of Pristannoye, 14 kilometers (8.7 mi) upstream from the Saratov Bridge. The construction of it started in late 1990s and by the year 2000, the first part was accomplished and set for use. The second part was completed and opened on 16 October 2009. Its total length (with approaches and viaducts) is 12,760 meters (41,860 ft).

Records
Preceded by Anghel Saligny Bridge	Europe’s longest bridge 1965	Succeeded by Zeeland Bridge
