= Decimalisation =

Converting a measuring system to a decimal base

Decimalisation or decimalization (see spelling differences) is the conversion of a system of currency or of weights and measures to units related by powers of 10.

Most countries have decimalised their currencies, converting them from non-decimal sub-units to a decimal system, with one basic currency unit and sub-units that are valued relative to the basic unit by a power of 10, most commonly 100 and exceptionally 1,000, and sometimes at the same time, changing the name of the currency and/or the conversion rate to the new currency.

Today, only two countries have de jure non-decimal currencies, these being Mauritania (where 1 ouguiya = 5 khoums) and Madagascar (where 1 ariary = 5 iraimbilanja): however, these currencies are de facto decimal as the value of both currencies' main unit is now so low that the sub-units are too small to be of any practical use, and coins of these sub-units are no longer used.

Russia was the first country to convert to a decimal currency when it decimalised under Tsar Peter the Great in 1704, resulting in the silver ruble being equal to 100 copper kopecks.

For weights and measures, this is also called metrication, replacing traditional units that are related in other ways, such as those formed by successive doubling or halving, or by more arbitrary conversion factors. Units of physical measurement, such as length and mass, were decimalised with the introduction of the metric system, which has been adopted by almost all countries (with the prominent exceptions of the United States, and, to a lesser extent, the United Kingdom and Canada). Thus, a kilometre is 1,000 metres, while a mile is 1,760 yards. Electrical units are decimalised worldwide.

Common units of time remain undecimalised. Although an attempt to decimalise them was made during the French Revolution, this proved to be unsuccessful and was abolished by Napoleon eleven years later.

== Currency decimalisation by region ==
Decimal currencies have sub-units based on a power of 10. Most sub-units are one-100th of the base currency unit, but currencies based on 1,000 sub-units also exist in several Arab countries.

Some countries changed the name of the base unit when they decimalised their currency, including:

Examples of currency decimalisation
New unit	=	×	Old unit	Year
German gold mark	=	1/3	Vereinsthaler	1873
Danish krone	=	1/2	Danish rigsdaler	1875
South African rand	=	1/2	South African pound	1961
Australian dollar	=	1/2	Australian pound	1966
New Zealand dollar	=	1/2	New Zealand pound	1967
Fijian dollar	=	1/2	Fijian pound	1969
Nigerian naira	=	1/2	Nigerian pound	1973

=== Europe ===
In 1534, the kopek of Novgorod was equated to 1/100 of the ruble of Moscow, thus making the Russian ruble Europe's first decimal currency. In the 18th century were introduced the coins grivennik (10 kopeks) and imperial (10 rubles). This was not quite decimal currencies as they are known today, as there were smaller units beneath the kopek itself: the denga (half a kopek, or 200 to the ruble) and the polushka (half a denga, one-quarter kopek, or 400 to the ruble). After the October Revolution, the Soviet Union transitioned to a purely decimal model by eliminating the non-decimal subdivisions of the kopek.

France introduced the franc in 1795 to replace the livre tournois, abolished during the French Revolution. France introduced decimalisation in a number of countries that it invaded during the Napoleonic period.

The Dutch guilder decimalised in 1817, becoming equal to 100 centen (instead of 20 stuivers = 160 duiten = 320 penningen), with the last pre-decimal coins withdrawn from circulation in 1848.

Sweden introduced decimal currency in 1855. The riksdaler was divided into 100 öre. The riksdaler was renamed the krona in 1873.

The Austro-Hungarian Empire decimalised the gulden in 1857, concurrent with its transition from the Conventionsthaler to the Vereinsthaler standard.

Spain introduced its decimal currency unit, the peseta, in 1868, replacing all previous currencies.

Cyprus decimalised the Cypriot pound in 1955, which comprised 1,000 mils, later replaced by 100 cents.

The United Kingdom (including its overseas territories) and Ireland decimalised sterling and the Irish pound, respectively, in 1971. (See £sd and Decimal Day.)

Malta decimalised the lira in 1972.

=== The Americas ===
==== North America ====
===== United States =====
Decimalisation was introduced into the Thirteen Colonies by the American Revolution, and then enshrined in US law by the Coinage Act of 1792.

===== Canada =====
Decimalisation in Canada was complicated by the different jurisdictions before Confederation in 1867. In 1841, the united Province of Canada's Governor General, Lord Sydenham, argued for establishment of a bank that would issue dollar currency (the Canadian dollar). Francis Hincks, who would become the Province of Canada's Prime Minister in 1851, favoured the plan. Ultimately the provincial assembly rejected the proposal. In June 1851, the Canadian legislature passed a law requiring provincial accounts to be kept decimalised as dollars and cents. The establishment of a central bank was not touched upon in the 1851 legislation. The British government delayed the implementation of the currency change on a technicality, wishing to distinguish the Canadian currency from the United States' currency by referencing the units as "Royals" rather than "Dollars". The British delay was overcome by the Currency Act of 1 August 1854. In 1858, coins denominated in cents and imprinted with "Canada" were issued for the first time.

Decimalisation occurred in:

	Date	Notes
Province of Canada	1 August 1854	
Nova Scotia	1 July 1860	Ordered its first coinage in 1860, but the coins were not shipped by the Royal Mint until 1862
New Brunswick	1 November 1860	Like Nova Scotia, the coins were received in 1862
Newfoundland	1866	Took effect in early 1865 and had different coinage from 1865 to 1947
Vancouver Island	1863	
British Columbia	1865	
Manitoba	1870	
Prince Edward Island	1871	

The colonial elite, the main advocates of decimalisation, based their case on two main arguments. The first was for facilitation of trade and economic ties with the United States, the colonies' largest trading partner; the second was to simplify calculations and reduce accounting errors.

===== Mexico =====
The Mexican peso was formally decimalised in the 1860s with the introduction of coins denominated in centavos; however, the currency did not fully decimalise in practice immediately and pre-decimal reales were issued until 1897.

===== Bermuda =====
Bermuda decimalised in 1970, by introducing the Bermudian dollar equal to 8 shillings 4 pence (100 pence, effectively equal to the US dollar under the Bretton Woods system).

==== Caribbean ====
- The Cuban peso decimalised in 1869 (became equal to 100 centavos instead of 8 reales).
- The Dominican peso decimalised in 1877 (became equal to 100 centavos instead of 8 reales).
- The Haitian gourde decimalised in 1881 by peg to French franc (became equal to 100 centimes/santim).
- The Netherlands Antillean guilder decimalised in 1892 by peg to Dutch guilder (became equal to 100 centen).
- The British West Indies dollar decimalised in 1955.
- The Jamaican dollar decimalised in 1969.

==== Central America ====
- Costa Rican peso decimalised in 1864, divided into 100 centavos, instead of 8 reales.
- Honduran peso decimalised in 1871, divided into 100 centavos, instead of 8 reales.
- British Honduran (Belize) dollar decimalised in 1885, divided into 100 cents.

==== South America ====
- The Venezuelan peso decimalised in 1843.
- The Colombian peso decimalised in 1847 (became equal to 10 décimos instead of 8 reales, later became equal to 100 centavos).
- The Chilean peso decimalised in 1851 (became equal to 10 décimos or 100 centavos instead of 8 reales).
- The Uruguayan peso decimalised in 1863.
- The Peruvian sol decimalised in 1863 (equal to 10 dineros or 100 centavos).
- The Paraguayan peso decimalised in 1870 (became equal to 100 centésimos, later centavos, instead of 8 reales).
- The Ecuadorian peso decimalised in 1871.
- The Argentine peso decimalised in 1881.

=== Africa ===
- The Ethiopian birr decimalised in 1931 (became equal to 100 metonnyas instead of 16 ghersh).
- The Ghanaian cedi decimalised in 1965. The new base unit was worth eight shillings and four pence, making one penny equal to one pesewa (1/100 cedi).
- The Zambian kwacha decimalised in 1968.
- The Rhodesian dollar decimalised in 1970.
- The Gambian dalasi decimalised in 1971. Unusually, the new base unit was worth four shillings (1/5 of a pound).
- The Malawian kwacha decimalised in 1971.
- The Nigerian naira decimalised in 1973.

==== South Africa ====
The rand was introduced on 14 February 1961. A Decimal Coinage Commission had been set up in 1956 to consider a move away from the denominations of pounds, shillings and pence, submitting its recommendation on 8 August 1958. It replaced the South African pound as legal tender, at the rate of 2 rand = 1 pound or 10 shillings to the rand. Australia, New Zealand and Rhodesia also chose ten shillings as the base unit of their new currency.

=== Oceania ===
==== Australia and New Zealand ====
1964 ABC report describing the design of the soon to be introduced Australian decimal coins

Australia decimalised on 14 February 1966, with the Australian dollars replacing the Australian pound. A television campaign containing a memorable jingle, sung to the tune of "Click Go the Shears", was used to help the public to understand the changes. New Zealand decimalised on 10 July 1967, with the New Zealand dollars replacing the New Zealand pound.

In both countries, the conversion rate was one pound to two dollars and 10 shillings to one dollar.

Conversion between £sd and $c, Australia and New Zealand
£sd	$c
£50	$100
£10	$20
£5	$10
£1	$2
10/–	$1
5/–	50c
2/–	20c
1/–	10c
6d	5c
3d	2.5c
1.2d	1c
1d	5/6c

To ease the transition, the new 5-cent, 10-cent and 20-cents coins were the same size and weight, and the new $1, $2, $10 and $20 banknotes (and the new $100 banknote in New Zealand) were the same colour, as their pre-decimal equivalents. Because of the inexact conversion between cents and pence, people were advised to tender halfpenny, penny and threepence coins in multiples of sixpence (the lowest common multiple of both systems) during the transition.

==== Rest of Oceania ====
- Tongan pa'anga decimalised on 3 April 1967
- Samoan tala decimalised on 10 July 1967
- Fijian dollar decimalised on 15 January 1969

=== Asia ===
King Chulalongkorn decimalised the Thai currency in 1897. The tical (baht) is now divided into one hundred satang.

Baht	Feuang	Att	Bia	> Decimalization >	Baht	Satang
**1**	8	64	6,400	> Decimalization >	**1**	100
1/8	**1**	8	800	> Decimalization >	**1**	100
1/64	1/8	**1**	100	> Decimalization >	**1**	100
1/6,400	1/64	1/100	**1**	> Decimalization >	**1**	100

Iran decimalised its currency in 1932, with the rial, subdivided into 100 new dinars, replacing the qiran at par.

Saudi Arabia decimalised the riyal in 1963, with 1 riyal = 100 halalas. Between 1960 and 1963, the riyal was worth 20 qirsh, and before that, it was worth 22 qirsh.

The Yemen Arab Republic introduced the coinage system of 1 North Yemeni rial = 100 fils in 1974, to replace the 1 rial = 40 buqsha = 80 halala = 160 zalat system. The country was one of the last to convert its coinage.

Japan historically had two decimal subdivisions of the yen: the sen (1/100) and the rin (1/1,000). However, they were taken out of circulation as of December 31, 1953, and all transactions are now conducted in multiples of 1 yen.

==== Rupee-anna-pice-pie to Rupee-paisa conversion ====
India changed from the rupee, anna, pie system to decimal currency on 1 April 1957. Pakistan decimalised its currency in 1961.

In India, Pakistan, and other places under British colonization where a system of 1 rupee = 16 anna = 64 pice (old paisa) = 192 pie was used, the decimalisation process defines 1 rupee = 100 naya (new) paisa. The following table shows the conversion of common denominations of coins issued in modern India and Pakistan.

- **Bold** denotes the actual denomination written on the coins

Rupee	Anna	Pice	Pie	Paisa/Naya paisa
1/192	**1/12**	1/3	**1 pie**	25/48 ≈ 0.5208
1/128	1/8	**1/2 pice**	1 1/2	25/32 = 0.78125
1/64	1/4	**1 pice**	3	1 9/16 = 1.5625
1/32	**1/2 anna**	2	6	3 1/8 = 3.125
1/16	**1 anna**	4	12	6 1/4 = 6.25
1/8	**2 annas**	8	24	12 1/2 = 12.5
**1/4 rupee**	**4 annas**	16	48	25
**1/2 rupee**	**8 annas**	32	96	50
**1 rupee**	16	64	192	100

Burma (now Myanmar) decimalised in 1952 (predating the Indian case) by changing from the rupee (worth 16 pe, each of 4 pyas) to the kyat (worth 100 pyas).

Ceylon (now Sri Lanka) decimalised in 1869, dividing the rupee into one hundred cents.

=== Mauritania and Madagascar ===
Mauritania and Madagascar theoretically retain currencies with units whose values are in the ratio five to one: the Mauritanian ouguiya (MRU) is equivalent to five khoums, and the Malagasy ariary (MGA) to five iraimbilanja.

In practice, however, the value of each of these two larger units is very small: as of 2021, the MRU is traded against the euro at about 44:1, and the MGA at about 4,600:1. In each of these countries, the smaller denomination is no longer used, although in Mauritania there is still a "one-fifth ouguiya" coin.

== Non-currency cases ==
=== Securities ===
In the special context of quoting the prices of stocks, traded almost always in blocks of 100 or more shares and usually in blocks of many thousands, stock exchanges in the United States used eighths or sixteenths of dollars, until converting to decimals between September 2000 and April 2001.

Similarly, in the United Kingdom, the prices of government securities continued to be quoted in multiples of 1/32 of a pound (7 1/2 d or 3 1/8 p) long after the currency was decimalised.

=== Metrication ===
The idea of measurement and currency systems where units are related by factors of ten was suggested by Simon Stevin who in 1585 first advocated the use of decimal numbers for everyday purposes. The Metric system was developed in France in the 1790s as part of the reforms introduced during the French Revolution. Its adoption was gradual, both within France and in other countries, but its use is nearly universal today. One aspect of measurement decimalisation was the introduction of metric prefixes to derive bigger and smaller sizes from base unit names. Examples include kilo for 1,000, hecto for 100, centi for 1/100 and milli for 1/1,000. The list of metric prefixes has expanded in modern times to encompass a wider range of measurements.

While the common units of time, minute, hour, day, month and year, are not decimalised, there have been proposals for decimalisation of the time of day and decimal calendar systems. Astronomers use a decimalised Julian day number to record and predict events. Decades, centuries, and millennia are examples of common units of time that are decimalised. The millisecond is a decimalised unit of time equivalent to a thousandth of a second, and is sometimes used in computing contexts.

The gradian or grade is an angular unit defined as one hundredth of the right angle (approximately 0.0157 rad), further divided into one hundred centigrades.

In computer science, there are several metric prefixes used with units of information. For example, a kilobit is equivalent to 1,000 bits.

=== Abbreviations for large amounts of money ===
Decimal abbreviations are sometimes used for large amounts of money. For example, the letter K (standing for kilo-) can be used to indicate that a sum of money ought to be multiplied by 1,000 i.e. $250k means $250,000. The letters M or MM can be used to indicate that a sum of money should be multiplied by a million i.e. $3.5M means $3,500,000. The letter B similarly stands for a billion.

== See also ==
- British coinage
- Decimal Day
- Metrication
- Non-decimal currencies
