= Glossary of Russian currency =

== Decimal ==
The decimal currency in Russia was introduced by Peter the Great during his monetary reform

Names of many of the coins are traced from older times.

- Kopeck
- Denga, polkopeiki = 1/2 kopeck
- Polushka = 1/2 denga
- Altyn = 3 kopeck
- Grivennik = 10 kopeck
- Pyatialtynny = 15 kopeck coin literally "5 altyn coin"
- Dvugrivenny = 20 kopeck, literally "two-grivennik coin"
- Half-poltina (polupoltina, polupoltinnik = 1/2 poltina = 25 kopeck
- Poltinnik, Poltina = 1/2 ruble or 50 kopeck
- Ruble = 100 kopeck
- Chervonets = 10 rubles

== Old currency ==
- Grivna, cf. Polish grzywna
- Imperial = 10 rubles
- Half-imperial (poluimperial) = 5 rubles
- Efimok, Russian term for West European silver coins; derived from "Joachimsthaler": the name Efim is Russian for "Joachim".

== Non-Russian ==
- Grosh = Groschen, see ru:Грош. Various Groschen, e.g., Polish grosz. In 18th century "grosh" ha come to mean 2-kopeck coin. Hence the sayings expressing low value of something: "грош им цена" (literally "worth a grosh", i.e., "not worth a dime"), "пропадешь ни за грош" (you will die not even for a grosh), etc.

== See also ==
- Slang terms for money#Russia
