= Economy of the Pskov Republic =

The economy of the Pskov Republic (1348–1510) was dominated by merchants trading to and from the city of Pskov (originally Pleskov) and the associated Pskov Land, primarily via the river Velikaya and connected waterways. It also had well-developed farming, fishing, blacksmithing, jewellery-making and construction industries.

Pskov played a special role in medieval Russian trade with Western Europe. Archaeological evidence indicates the presence of imported goods in Pskov as early as the 10th and 11th centuries. This was due to the extensive trade contacts between Kievan Rus' and Scandinavia. Archaeological excavation of the Pskov necropolis in 2003–2004 revealed a high social status of the buried. Large variety of around 60 found articles, among them Byzantine coins, bronze and copper items, confirmed that Pskov was not an economically isolated region, and showed extensive military and commercial contacts with both the West and the East.

The Pskov Republic received recognition as a sovereign state after the Treaty of Bolotovo was concluded in 1348, which granted political independence from the Novgorod Republic. This happened just ten years before the establishment of the Hanseatic League, the late medieval northern European commercial and defensive confederation of merchant guilds and their market towns situated along the coasts of the Baltic and North Seas, which played a major part in Pskov's economic development.

== Administration ==
At that time, Pskov was a veche republic, where all free people were considered its citizens with the right to participate in the governing of their city-state, which was expressed in veche assemblies and election of local officials. Because many Pskov dwellers were involved in trade and craft, the share of merchants in the ruling class was high. These merchants then took positions of sotskiys (Russian: сотский, initially, an official who represented a hundred households), izborniks (Russian: изборник, elected officials) and posadniks (Russian: посадник, a representative of the prince), which allowed them to participate in the diplomatic talks and stimulate better trade conditions. This sociopolitical system was a premise for establishing tight economic and political relations with the Hanseatic League.

== Relations with the Novgorod Republic ==
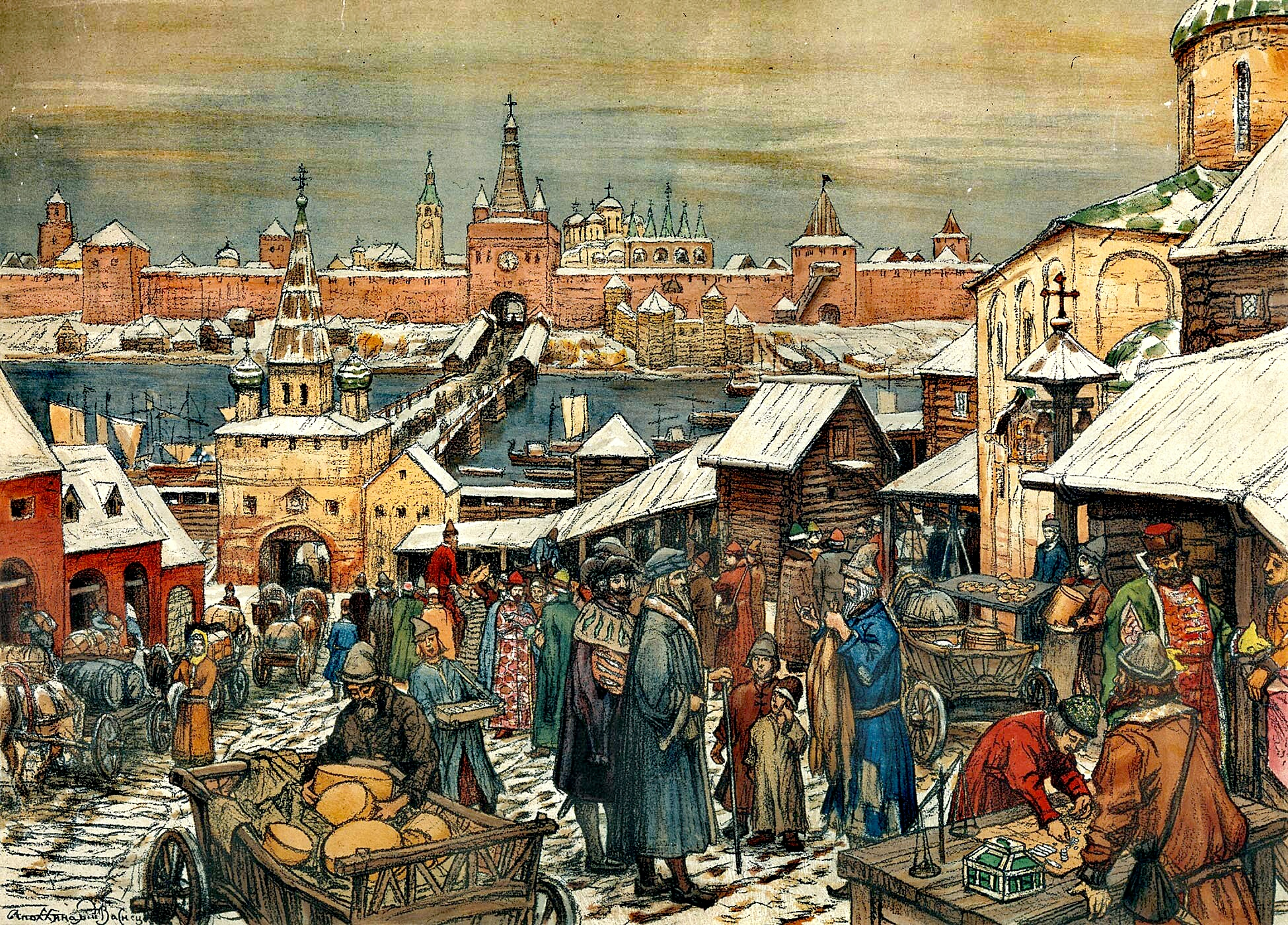
The marketplace in Novgorod, by Apollinary Vasnetsov (c. 1908).

After Pskov gained its independence from Novgorod, the latter had greater advantages in trade with the Hanse. First of all, it was caused by enormous Novgorodian resources, which had in its possession vast territories of the Russian North – stretching from the Baltic Sea to the northern Ural Mountains. From its northern colonies, the Novgorod market received huge quantities of fur, and only part of it was reaching Pskov. The Pskov Land compared to Novgorod represented small border territories with a poor resource base. Thus, the Pskov market partially played a transit role that resulted in a smaller trade volume, comparing to the Novgorod market.

Trade between Pskov and Novgorod in the 11th to 15th centuries was quite intensive. Main trade route between the two cities was along the Cheryokha and Shelon rivers. Two-cities trade affairs can be witnessed in birch bark manuscripts from the 13th century where Pskov merchants asking their Novgorod counterparts to bring squirrel fur skins to Pskov to cover the high demand. These birch bark commercial correspondence is the evidence of well-established trade communication between the two republics, and merchants from both Novgorod and Pskov conducting joint trade operations.

With gaining its independence from Novgorod, Pskov merchants lost their right to trade at Novgorod Torg (market) and were treated as foreign tradesmen. As any other merchants from the Hanseatic League, Pskov businessman could only trade from within their own gostiny dvor (Russian: гости́ный двор, literally “guest yard” or “guest court”) – collections of small shops where merchants from other cities could, at designated times, come to sell their wares: “And Pskovians and Germans with their goods shall trade from their yards“(«А псковичи и немцы с своим товаром ставятся на своих дворех»). This meant that in Novgorod Republic Pskov traders were equal in the trade rights with the German merchants.

Pskov gostiny dvor in Novgorod was noted for its large size. Its length was 60 meters, it had 4 living houses and 41 storehouse. Beside the gostiny dvor there was set up the lʹnjanoj rjad (Russian: льняной ряд, “linen stall”) - row of merchant stalls where linen and hemp brought from Pskov lands were sold in large quantities. Administration of gostiny dvor provided order and adjudicated legal disputes between Russian and foreign merchants. There was a pier on the Volkhov River where merchants could sell their goods without unloading their boats.

The establishment of Pskov gostiny dvor in Novgorod was an important condition for establishing trade relations with eastern territories. Pskov merchant caravans reached Upper Volga cities: Rzhev, Tver, Yaroslavl, but preferred to not venture further east as long journeys and high logistic expenses – duties paid when crossing multiple administrative border made such voyages economically unviable.

== Relations with the Hanseatic League ==
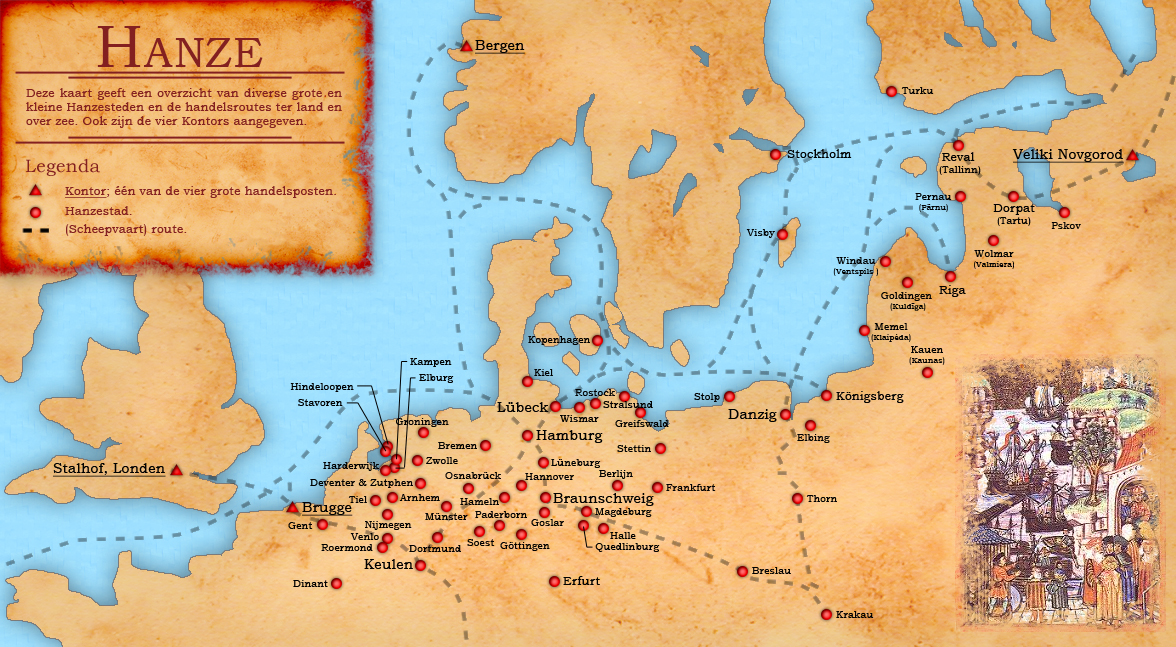
Map of the Hanseatic League, showing principal Hanseatic cities and Pskov

Map of the Teutonic Order State (in salmon) ca. 1455

The establishment of diplomatic and trade relations between the Pskov Republic and the Hansa was logical due to its geographical location, political system and its independence from Novgorod and other Russian principalities.

Pskov was trading with many Hanseatic cities – Lübeck, Danzig, Riga, but most of all with Reval (Tallinn) and Dorpat (Tartu). Riga, Reval and Dorpat were part of Teutonic Order in Livonia, or as it often called - Livonian Order – confederation of Order dominions, church lands and Free imperial cities (Freistädte). Pskov has also traded with Narva – the major Livonian city which was not part of the Hanseatic League. Narva's proximity to Novgorod contributed to the rapid growth of its trade significance. Narva traded with Novgorod and Pskov even during the bitterest of Russian-Hanseatic relations.

According to the earliest written records of 1228, Pskov had peace agreements with its western neighbors and even refused Novgorodian calls to go to war with Livonian Riga, showing their independence from Novgorod in their foreign affairs. In the same records, there could have been some clauses regarding the ways to resolve economic disputes between merchants.

Although in 1242 Novgorod has reestablished its control over Pskov, Pskovians kept their independence in economic relations with the Hanseatic city-states. Despite numerous military conflicts between Novgorod and Livonian cities which were disturbing peace in the region, Pskovians preferred to continue economic affairs with the Hansa. In the 15th century, Pskovian-Hanseatic economic relations were disrupted after signing the Treaty of Salynas in 1398, which led to Pskovia-Livonian wars in 1406–1409. Although Novgorod supported Pskov in these wars, Pskovians most of the time preferred to continue trade with the West. At one point, Novgorod responded by stopping all the traffic from the West via Pskov route, turning caravans back to Pskov and suggesting to use the “official” Novgorodian trade route via Narva. In 1417, Pskov signed an agreement with the Livonian Order which, aside from a military neutrality pact, had clauses concerning free trade and diplomatic relations.

Arms trade with the veche republics was very profitable for the Hanseatic merchants. In fact, it was so profitable that during the Novgorodian–Livonian wars in the 1420s, Hanseatic merchants continued to smuggle arms and metals to Novgorod and Pskov despite the Livonian prohibition of such trade.

Until the 16th century, Pskov didn't have a dedicated German gostiny dvor, but since as early as the 13th century, German merchants occupied a special quarter in Pskov where they rented houses and storage for their goods. This place was called the "German riverside" (“немецкий берег”).

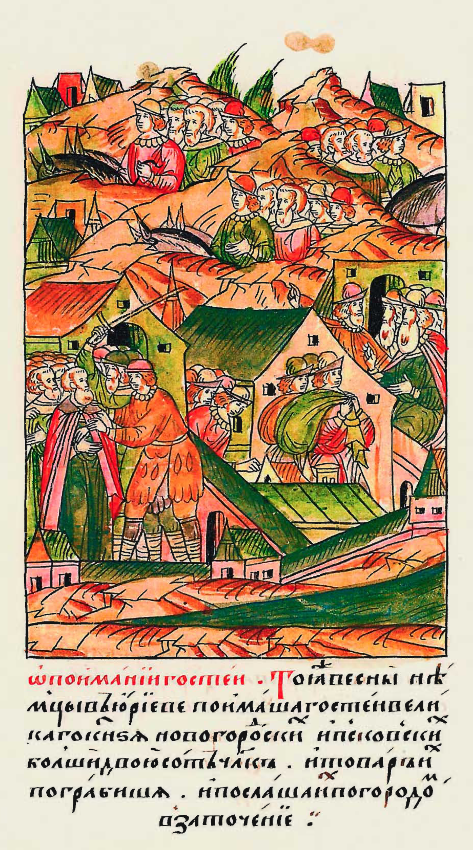
The 16th-century Facial Chronicle showing Pskovian merchants detained and robbed in Dorpat

Hanseatic cities of the Baltic region didn’t have a dedicated space for Pskov merchants similar to Hanseatic “guest courts” in Russian cities for the merchants from the Hansa. Russian Orthodox churches in Livonian cities became the “lodgement” for Russian merchants trade operations, providing place to store the goods. Also, merchants used churches for their gatherings and celebrations. In return, merchants supported the churches financially by providing donations. The Russian merchants rented houses around these churches, so the neighborhoods around were called “Russian end” (Russian area).

In the 1430s as the Hanseatic influence in Northern Europe was declining due to the rapid development of the Netherlands and the center of Hansa-Novgorod trade shifted to Livonian cities. The importance of the Pskov Republic grew due to its location between Novgorod and Livonia.

In 1474 Dorpat and Pskov signed a very detailed trade agreement which regulated trade relations between Pskov and Dorpat merchants. The agreement guaranteed the free passage of goods for both sides, abolished duties and customs control. This agreement was beneficial for Pskov, because now Pskovians could trade not only with Dorpat citizens but also with traders from Riga, Reval and all “Dorpat guests”. The document regulated in detail quality control and weighing of the goods.

After the execution of two Russian merchants in Livonian Reval in 1494, a 20-year conflict started between Russia and the Hansa. Ivan III, the Grand Prince of Moscow, responded to the execution by closing down the Hansa Kontor in Novgorod, arresting 49 Hanseatic merchants, seizing their goods and banning the import of salt from the Hansa. Pskov merchants tried to lift this ban and supply Russian cities with Hanseatic salt, but did not succeed. Although Pskov continued to trade with the West, it did not benefit significantly from the disruption of Hansa-Novgorod trade.

By the end of the 15th century and until the end of Pskov independence, the leading role in Russian-Livonian trade shifted from Novgorod to Pskov. In 1509 Pskov signed a 14-year trade agreement with Livonia. It was the last foreign policy document signed by independent Pskov. It granted Pskov merchants free trade access to Livonian cities.

== Commodities ==
At the time of the Pskov Republic furs were the main Russian export, however the Pskovian production was small compared to the Novgorod. In the 14th and 15th centuries, wax became the main Pskov exported product. Wax was very important in medieval Europe as the raw material for candles used in lighting and religious ceremonies. Western Europe could not produce enough wax to satisfy the demand and had to buy it from the East, where honey hunting was well developed due to the abundance of forests. Hanseatic traders were not allowed to buy poor-quality wax from Pskov. Wax was filtered by melting, “packed” in wheels, weighed and its weight was sealed on the wheel. Salo (cured slabs of fatback) was another important export commodity. A dedicated quality control facility was organized in Dorpat to test the imported salo from Pskov.

One of the most valuable imported commodities for Pskovians was salt as Russia was unable to satisfy its demand with domestically produced salt. Hanseatic traders sold salt not by weight but by bags, which often led to fraud. At the same time in the Hanseatic cities salt was sold by weight. Another important products imported from Hansa to Pskov and Russia were Western European-made textile and metals (silver and nonferrous metals). Some types of food were also brought from the West and sold in Pskov, such as herring and wine. Ingredients for medicine (for example thyme) also had great significance in Pskov-Hansa trade. A significant part of the trade flows in the Middle Ages consisted of alcoholic beverages. While wine was expensive and was imported in small volume, beer and mead at the same time were imported heavily. Mead was also produced in Pskov and Novgorod and exported to Dorpat.

Barley, oats, wheat, hemp and flax were grown in the Pskov land. The chronicles record instances of poor harvests and high prices caused by rains and frosts and years when in spite of adverse weather enough grain was stored in the Krom and the prices remained low. In 1420-22 there was a famine in other Russian principalities and many people came to Pskov seeking to buy bread.

== Currency ==
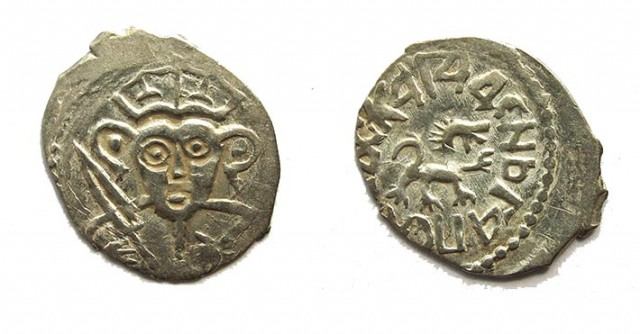
Pskov Republic denga coins

Until the 15th century, Pskov used grivnas along with Arabic, Western European and Byzantine coins. According to the Pskov Chronicles, Pskovians started to use German pfennig in trade with the Hansa in 1409. Amongst themselves, they continued to use marten snouts as petty cash. In 1425, Pskov started to mint its own silver coin, called the pskovka.

The main currency used in the trade between Hanseatic cities in the 16th century was the thaler – a heavy (29 grams) high-quality silver coin which was minted in German cities, most of them in Bohemian Joachimsthal, after which thalers in Pskov and Novgorod were called “efimki”. In the Pskov-Hansa trade, thalers minted in Lübeck were used most often. Until the 17th century, the thaler exchange rate was 1:36 (36 kopeks for 1 thaler). In the first half of the 17th century, one thaler was equal to 100 denga (1/2 ruble). Golden coins were rarely used in the Baltic trade. These rare coins were mostly 3.4 gram golden ducats minted in Hungary. A large part of trade operations were conducted using a credit system, but in the absence of bank loans, merchants gave their counterparty promissory notes, which then were the basis for the right to demand repayment.

== Bibliography ==
=== Primary sources ===
- Pskov Third Chronicle.
- Great Novgorod and Pskov Manuscripts.

=== Literature ===
- Arakcheev, V.A. (2012). Псков и Ганза в эпоху средневековья : Научная справка [Pskov and the Hansa during the Middle Ages : Scientific background] (PDF). Pskov.
- Bolkhovitinov E.A., Исторія княжества Псковскаго : Съ присовокупленіемъ плана города Пскова : Часть I. [History of the Pskovian Principality : with attached map of the city of Pskov: Part I] (1831). Kiev.
- Esper, Thomas (1966). "Russia and the Baltic 1494–1558". Slavic Review. 25 (3). Association for Slavic, East European, and Eurasian Studies: 458–474. doi:10.2307/2492857. ISSN 0037-6779. JSTOR 2492857.
