= Altyn =

Historical Russian currency

An altyn (Russian алты́н, also алты́нник, altynnik) is a historical Russian currency (symbol:). The name in Tatar is altın (алтын) meaning "gold", and altı (алты) meaning "six", since it was worth six dengi, equivalent to three kopeck silver, then copper, a small value coin, or 180–206 copper puls.

== History ==
From the 14th century, the altyn had been in use in several Russian principalities as a Eurasian currency between Russian and Asian traders. Treaties between the principalities of Moscow, Ryazan and Tver show that the rate remained the same. One altyn was equal to six dengi, while one ruble was equal to 200 (in Moscow) or 220 (in Pskov) dengi. In the Sudebnik of 1497, one ruble was equal to 200 dengi, while one altyn was equal to six dengi.

They were minted from 1654 under Alexis I, and under Peter I as silver coins from 1704 to 1718. Peter began minting silver ruble coins in 1704 and made the ruble the first decimal currency; the altyn was equal to three kopecks. Later, they were revived under Nicholas I as copper coins with a value of three kopecks from 1839. While the name altyn eventually got lost, three-kopeck coins circulated in Russia until 1991.

In the 2010s, the Eurasian Economic Commission drafted first proposals to revive the altyn by 2025 as a common currency of the Eurasian Economic Union. The international sanctions against Russia reportedly encouraged the bloc to expedite the process by 3–5 years but to no avail. As of December 2025, the currency had still not been re-introduced in any capacity.

== See also ==
- Glossary of Russian currency

== Sources ==
- "Алтын" . Brockhaus and Efron Encyclopedic Dictionary (in Russian). 1906.
- Feldbrugge, Ferdinand J. M. (2 October 2017). A History of Russian Law: From Ancient Times to the Council Code (Ulozhenie) of Tsar Aleksei Mikhailovich of 1649. BRILL. ISBN 978-90-04-35214-8.
- Gouzévitch, Irina; Gouzévitch, Dmitri (2009). "Introducing mathematics, building an empire: Russia under Peter I". In Robson, Eleanor; Stedall, Jacqueline (eds.). The Oxford Handbook of the History of Mathematics. OUP Oxford. ISBN 978-0-19-921312-2.
- Snodgrass, Mary Ellen (25 July 2019). Coins and Currency: An Historical Encyclopedia, 2d ed. McFarland. ISBN 978-1-4766-3665-8.
- Uzdennikov V., Монеты России (1700—1917) [Coins of Russia (1700–1917)]: Издание третье. — М.: Collector’s Books; IP Media Inc., 2004.
