= Chernihiv hryvnia =

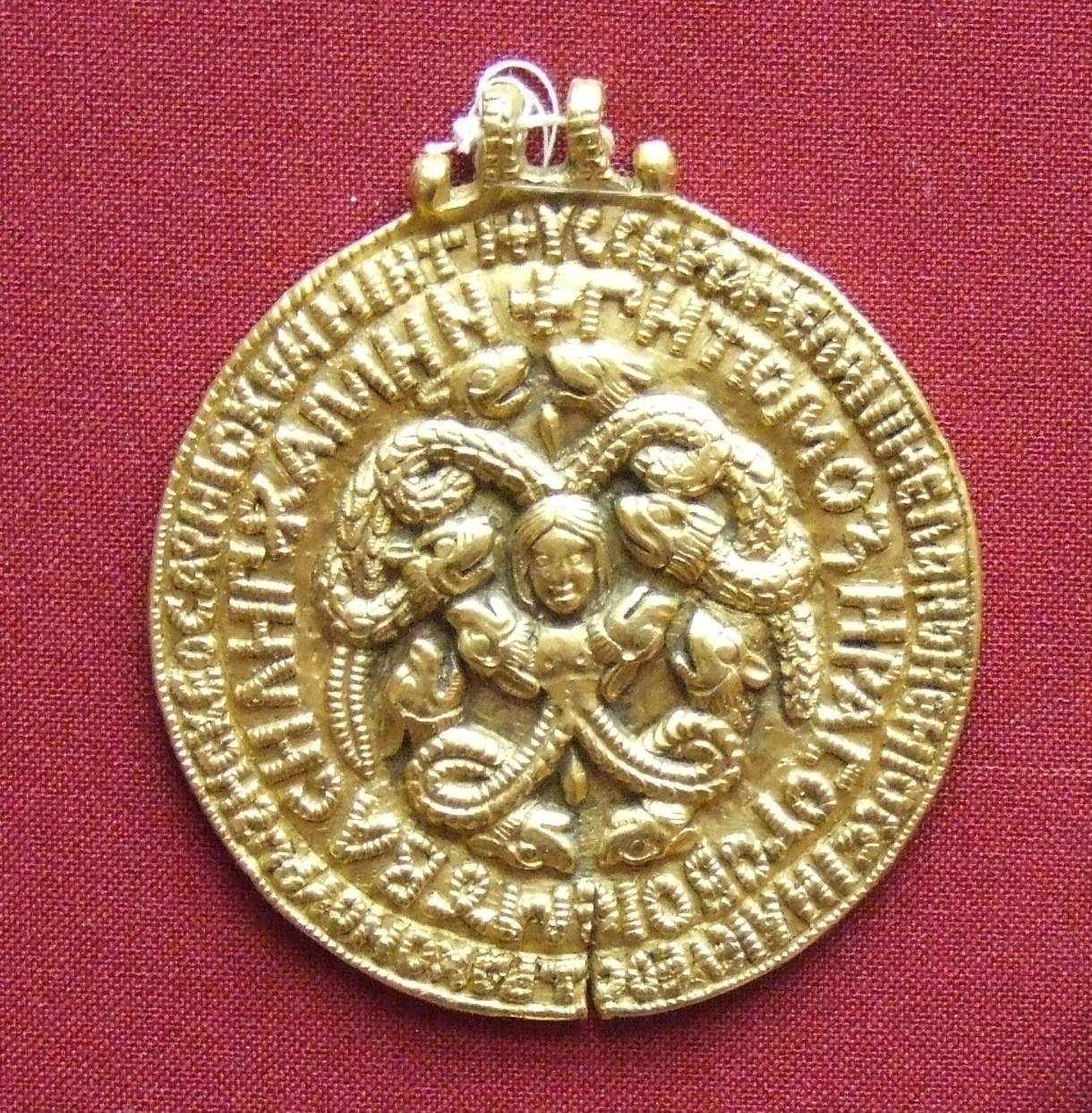
Chernihiv hryvnia

Chernihiv hryvnia or Chernigov grivna was a measure of weight and a currency of the Chernihiv principality. It had a very close shape to Kyiv's hryvnia and in weight was as Novgorod's hryvnia (204 g).

Chernihiv hryvnia is a gold medallion belonging to the type of coil amulets (weight approx. 186 g, diameter 7.3 cm).

== History ==
Chernihiv hryvnia was accidentally found in 1821 on the banks of the Bilous River (right tributary of the Desna) near Chernihiv. It is made by wax casting with inscriptions and images additionally carved. The obverse is decorated with the image of the archangel with the inscription "Michael" (in Old Slavonic) and the text of the prayer "Holy, holy, holy..." (in Greek). The reverse depicts a woman's head, surrounded by intertwined snakes, with the text: "Lord help your servant Vasyl. Amen" in Old Ukrainian). The coin, given its high cost, could have belonged to a person of the prince's family. Orthodox Metropolitan Yevgeny Bolkhovitinov linked the Chernihiv hryvnia with Volodymyr Monomakh as the latter had the Christian name Vasyl and he ruled the Chernihiv principality at that time.

The coin is stored in the State Russian Museum in Saint Petersburg.

== See also ==
- History of Ukrainian hryvnia
- Grivna
- Grzywna
