= Non-decimal currency =

Currency with certain denominations

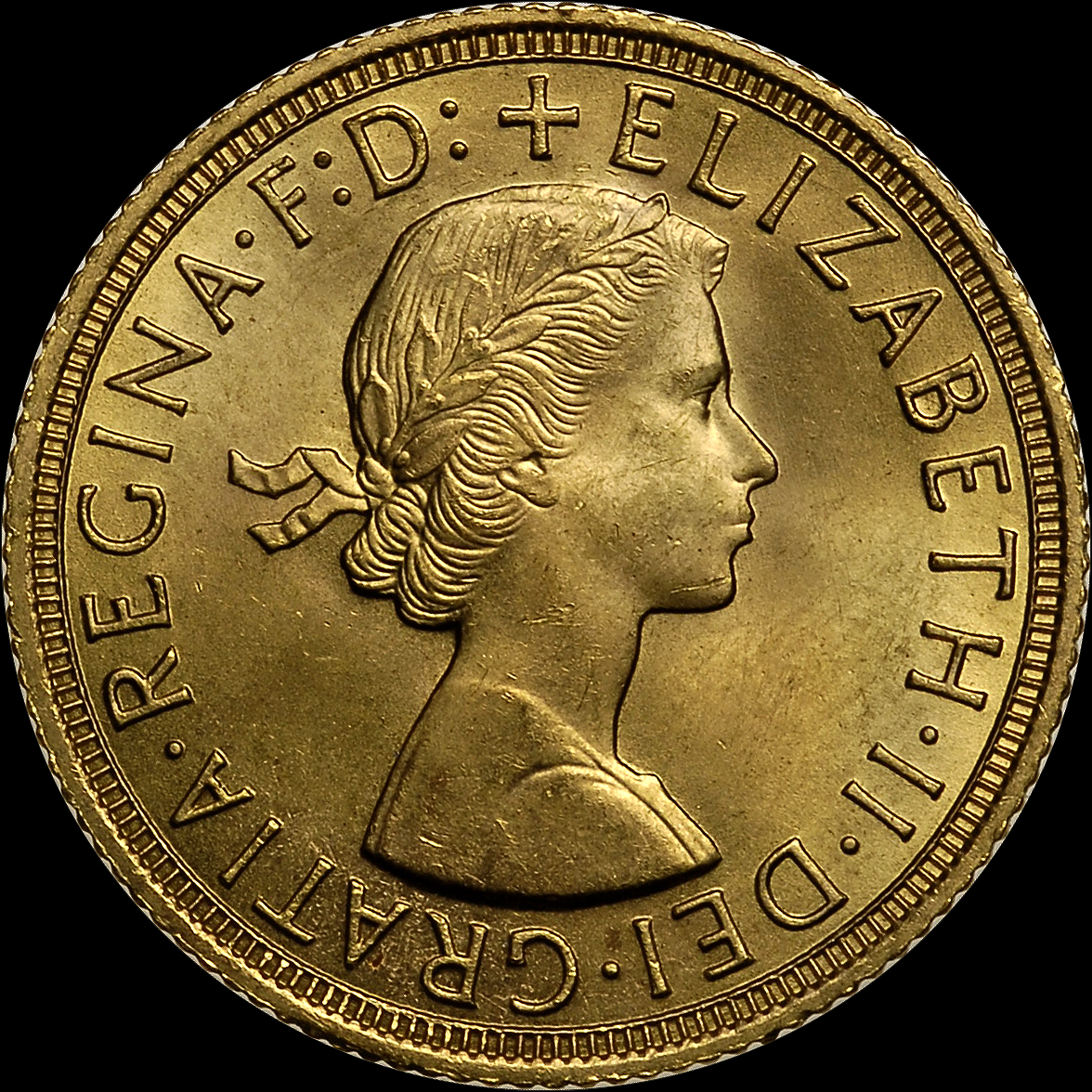
A British gold sovereign with a face value of £1. Prior to decimalisation on 15 February 1971, £1 was made up of 240 pence.

A non-decimal currency is a currency that has sub-units that are a non-decimal fraction of the main unit, i.e. the number of sub-units in a main unit is not a power of 10. Historically, most currencies were non-decimal, though virtually all are now decimal.

== Contemporary situation ==
Today, only two countries have non-decimal currencies: Mauritania, where 1 ouguiya = 5 khoums, and Madagascar, where 1 ariary = 5 iraimbilanja. However, these are only theoretically non-decimal, as in both cases the value of each sub-unit is too small to be of any practical use and coins of sub-unit denominations are no longer used.

The official currency of the Sovereign Military Order of Malta, which retains its claims of sovereignty under international law and has been granted permanent observer status at the United Nations, is the Maltese scudo, which is subdivided into 12 tarì, each of 20 grani with 6 piccoli to the grano.

All other contemporary currencies are either decimal or have no sub-units at all, either because they have been abolished or because they have lost all practical value and are no longer used.

== Historic non-decimal currencies ==
Historically, a variety of non-decimal systems have been used. For example, A vigesimal system (base 20) was in use within ancient Mesoamerica. A sexagesimal system (base 60) was in wide use in ancient Mesopotamia, as this system was used in measurements of time, geometry, currency, and other fields.

Decimal currencies also have disadvantages. The principal advantage of most non-decimal currencies is that they are more easily divided, particularly by numbers such as 3 and 8, than decimal currencies, due to being based upon conversion values that have a large number of factors. A currency with a 100:1 ratio is divisible neither into 3 nor into 8. For example, one-third of an Austrian Gulden (of 60 Kreuzer) was 20 Kreuzer while a third of a dollar is 33.3̅ cents. This divisibility is useful when trading and when sharing out sums of money. For these reasons, many states chose in the past to adopt non-decimal currencies based on divisions into sub-units such as 12 or 20, sometimes with more than one tier of sub-units.

There is a second, more fortuitous, way in which non-decimal currencies emerged. Often multiple currencies would circulate concurrently in an economy, with non-decimal exchange rates between them. For example, a group related currencies called Reichsthaler, rixdollar, riksdaler, rijksdaalder, and rigsdaler were widely accepted as a common accounting unit which represented a variety of local coins in Stockholm, Copenhagen, Antwerp, and Cologne. Inflation developed locally, with changing subdivisions. For instance the Riksdaler was equivalent to 2 silver dalers in Sweden in 1700, but after the 1715-19 devaluation of the silver daler coin until 1776 one Riksdaler equated to 3 daler silvermint. Most currencies made no distinction between units of accounting and units represented by coins and thus created such shifts. (A similar example in the UK was the guinea, which was worth slightly more than one pound sterling.)

In general, when the major unit was, say, a gold coin and the minor units were silver or copper coins, then when the relative values of the metals changed, perhaps because of an increase or decrease in the supply of one of the metals, then the number of minor units equivalent to one major unit would also change.

Thus the following list does not give a complete picture: it is a list of examples picked from different periods. Many of the subdivisions given below underwent historical changes.

The Russian ruble is often said to have become the first decimalized currency when Peter the Great established the ratio 1 ruble = 100 kopecks in 1701. The Japanese were in some sense earlier calculating with the silver momme and its decimal subunits - but then the momme was not a coin but a unit of weight equivalent to 3.75 g: accounting was by weight of silver. The British pound sterling was the last major currency to be decimalized, on 15 February 1971. The Maltese waited just one year (1972) before following suit and Nigeria followed in 1973. An early proposal for decimalizing the pound in the 19th century envisaged a system of 1 Pound = 10 florins = 100 dimes = 1000 cents. However the only step taken at that time was the introduction in 1849 of a florin (two shillings) coin (the earliest examples bore the inscription "One Tenth of a Pound").

=== List ===
A partial listing of former non-decimal currencies (giving only units of account):

- Ancient Greece — 1 drachma = 6 obols
- Denmark — 1 Krone = 8 Marks = 128 Skillings = 1536 Pfennigs; also 6 Marks = 1 Rigsbank Daler
- France — 1 livre = 20 sols = 240 deniers; also 20 francs = 1 Napoléon (and other less common denominations)
- Germany
  - Frankfurt — 1 Reichstaler = 90 Kreuzer = 360 Pfennige OR 1 Reichsgulden = 60 Kreuzer = 240 Pfennige
  - Hanover — 1 Thaler = 36 Mariengroschen = 288 Pfennige
  - Hamburg — 1 Thaler = 3 Mark = 48 Schillinge = 96 Pfennige; later 12 Pfennige = 1 Schilling
  - Prussia — 1 Thaler = 30 Silbergroschen
- India
  - Calcutta and Madras — 1 rupee = 16 annas = 64 paise = 192 pies Also, 1 gold mohur = 15 silver rupees
  - Bombay — 1 rupee = 4 quarters = 400 reas
- Iran — 1 Rial = 20 Shahi
- Kingdom of Ireland, Irish Free State, Republic of Ireland (until 1971)
  - 1 Irish pound = 20 shillings = 240 pence
  - 1 shilling = 12 pence
- Japan — separate gold, silver, and copper currencies, but linked during the Edo period
  - Gold: 1 ryō = 4 bu = 16 shu
  - Silver: 1 momme = 10 fun = 100 rin (1 ryō = officially 50 momme, market rates fluctuated with supply and demand and the value of the metal minted see Japan's Currency at Marteau)
  - Copper: 1 kan = 1000 mon (1 ryō = 4000 mon; hence, 1 bu = 1 kan)
- Netherlands — 1 gulden = 20 stuivers = 160 duit = 320 penningen
- Ottoman Empire — 1 kuruş = 40 para = 120 akçe
- Poland — 1 złoty = 30 groszy
- Roman Empire — 1 aureus = 25 denarii = 100 sestertii = 400 asses = 1600 quadrantes
- Siam (now Thailand) — 1 baht/tical = 8 fuang = 64 att. While the baht-fuang-att are the main divisions, there are other sub-divisions and super-divisions.
  - Sub-units
    - 1 baht/tical = 4 salung = 8 fuang = 16 sik = 32 siao/pai = 64 att = 128 solot = 6400 bia
  - Super-units
    - 1 hap = 80 chang = 1600 tamlung = 640000 baht/tical
- Spanish Empire — 1 peso = 8 reales (de plata fuerte) = 680 maravedíes (the pesos are the "pieces of eight" often referred to in stories about pirates, such as Treasure Island, vellon means the coin minted of an alloy with a low silver content.)
- Switzerland — 1 Gulden Rheinisch = 15 or 16 (later also 17 or 18) Batzen or = 20 Schilling; 1 Batzen = 10 Rappen; 1 Batzen = 4 Kreuzer (in Germany); 1 Schilling = 6 Angster = 12 Heller
- The United Kingdom and many countries formerly part of the British Empire — 1 pound = 4 crowns = 20 shillings = 240 pence = 960 farthings; these were units of account, although many other coins had informal or formal names (see coins of the pound sterling). In medieval England the unit of account was the mark, equivalent to two-thirds of a pound or 160 pence, or 13 shillings and four pence. Half a mark was a noble, equivalent to one-third of a pound or 80 pence, or 6 shillings and eight pence. For some purposes the guinea (21 shillings) was used as a unit of account, and in horse racing (e.g. prize money) guineas are still sometimes used, denoting its decimal equivalent of £1.05.
  - Guernsey - 1 Pound = 20 Shillings = 240 Pence = 1920 Doubles
  - Jersey - 1 Pound = 20 Shillings. Jersey didn't use pence and used fractional coins instead, ranging from 1/52nd to 1/4th of a shilling.

In the Eurozone, in the interval between fixing the conversion factors between national currencies and the euro and the introduction of euro coins, the national currencies were non-decimal subdivisions of the euro.

== Fictional non-decimal currencies ==
- Harry Potter: 1 Galleon = 17 Sickles = 493 Knuts
- Pern: Mark, no name for subdivisions, but occurs in denominations of 1/32, 1/16, 1/8, 1/4, 1/2, 1, 2, 5, and 10 marks (and a few 100 marks for large transactions)
- Simon the Sorcerer II: 1 Royal Crest = 5 Silver Sovereigns = 25 Dollars = 50 Queen's Shillings = 100 Crowns = 400 Grouts = 6400 Pence, additionally 1 King's Shilling = 3 Crowns, and 1 Gold Sovereign = 3 Silver Sovereigns. The currency system is intentionally made inconveniently complex and only ever used at one point of the game.
- Hitchhiker's Guide to the Galaxy: The Triganic Pu, subdivided into eight Ningis. The Ningi is a "triangular rubber coin six thousand eight hundred miles a side" and hence nobody has ever owned enough Ningis to own one Pu. The Ningi is not negotiable currency, as the banks refuse to deal in small change.
- Star Trek: Deep Space Nine: 1 brick of gold-pressed latinum = 20 bars = 400 strips = 40,000 slips.

== See also ==
- Decimalisation
- Denomination (currency)
