= Yefim =

Efim is a given name, also spelled as Yefim. It is derived from the Greek name Euthymios (Εὐθύμιος; Modern Greek pronunciation: [efθimios]; latinized as Euthymius). Notable people with the name include:

- Efim Alexandrov (born 1960), Russian-Jewish comedian
- Efim Bogoljubov (1889–1962), Russian-German chess grandmaster
- Efim Dzigan (1898–1981), Soviet film director
- Efim Etkind (1918–1999), Russian philologist
- Efim Fradkin (1924–1999), Russian physicist
- Efim Geller (1925–1998), Soviet chess grandmaster
- Efim Jourist (1947–2007), Ukrainian composer
- Efim Kolbintsev (1875–c. 1918), Russian peasant, treasurer, merchant and deputy of the Fourth Imperial Duma from Orenburg Governorate
- Efim Motpan (born 1971), Moldovan racewalker
- Efim Shifrin (born 1956), Russian actor
- Efim Zelmanov (born 1955), Russian-American mathematician
- Yefim Alekseyevich Cherepanov and Miron Yefimovich Cherepanov (1774–1842) and (1803–1849), Russian inventors, father and son
- Yefim Bronfman (born 1958), Russian-Israeli pianist
- Yefim Chaplits (1768–1825), ethnic Pole, general of the Russian Empire
- Yefim Chulak (born 1948), Russian former volleyball player
- Yefim Golyshev (1897–1970), Ukrainian-born painter and composer
- Yefim Karskiy (1861–1931), linguist-Slavist, ethnographer and paleographer
- Yefim Kopelyan (1912–1975), Russian actor of theater and cinema
- Yefim Moiseevich Fomin (1909–1941), Jewish-Soviet Political Commisar
