= Efim Kolbintsev =

Early 20th-century Russian politician

Efim Kolbintsev Russian: Ефим Колбинцев
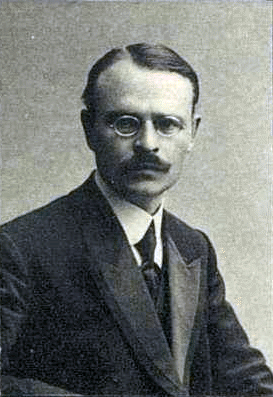
- photo of 1913

Deputy of the Fourth Imperial Duma
- In office 20 November 1912 – 6 October 1917
- Monarch: Nicholas II / monarchy abolished
- Succeeded by: post abolished

Personal details
- Born: Efim Grigoryevich Kolbintsev; 18 January 1875 Orenburg Governorate, Russian Empire
- Died: after 1917
- Party: Progressive Party

Efim Grigoryevich Kolbintsev (Russian: Ефим Григорьевич Колбинцев; 18 January 1875, Orenburg Governorate — after 1917) was a peasant, a treasurer, a merchant and a deputy of the Fourth Imperial Duma from Orenburg Governorate between 1912 and 1917. December 3, 1913 he was a member of a group of 39 parliamentarians who signed the Duma legislative proposal "On the establishment of a special spiritual administration (muftiate) for the Muslims of the North Caucasus." During the February Revolution of 1917, he carried out various assignments of the Provisional Committee of the State Duma.

== Literature ==
- Николаев А. Б. Колбинцев Ефим Григорьевич (in Russian) // Государственная дума Российской империи: 1906—1917 / Б. Ю. Иванов, А. А. Комзолова, И. С. Ряховская. — Москва: РОССПЭН, 2008. — P. 261. — 735 p. — ISBN 978-5-8243-1031-3.
- Колбинцев (in Russian) // Члены Государственной думы (портреты и биографии): Четвертый созыв, 1912—1917 г. / сост. М. М. Боиович. — Москва: Тип. Т-ва И. Д. Сытина, 1913. — P. 210. — LXIV, 454, [2] p.
- Законодательное предположение об учреждении особого духовного управления (муфтиата) для мусульман Северного Кавказа // Ab Imperio. — 2011. — № 4. — P. 279—284. — doi:10.1353/imp.2011.0005. (in Russian)
