= Polushka =

Historical Russian coin equal to 1/4 kopeck

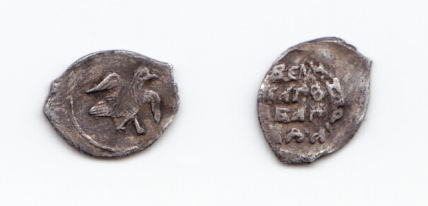
Silver polushka (poludenga) of Ivan the Terrible, minted in Veliky Novgorod in 1535–1584. Weight 0.15 g.

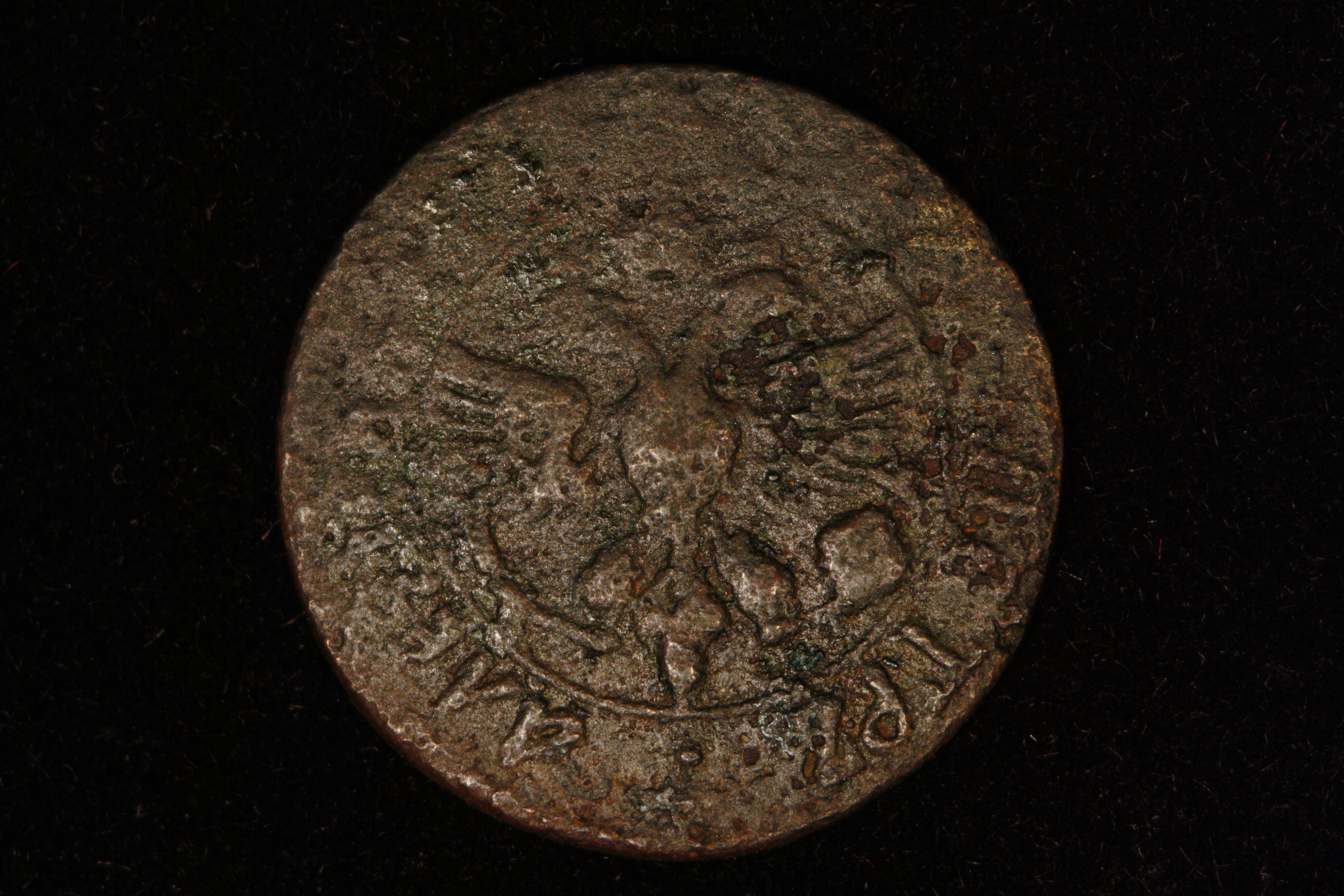
Obverse of a rare 1700 polushka. The legend around the eagle reads "ЦРЬ ПЕТР АЛЕКСЕЕВИЧ" or Tsar Petr Alekseevich (Peter the Great)

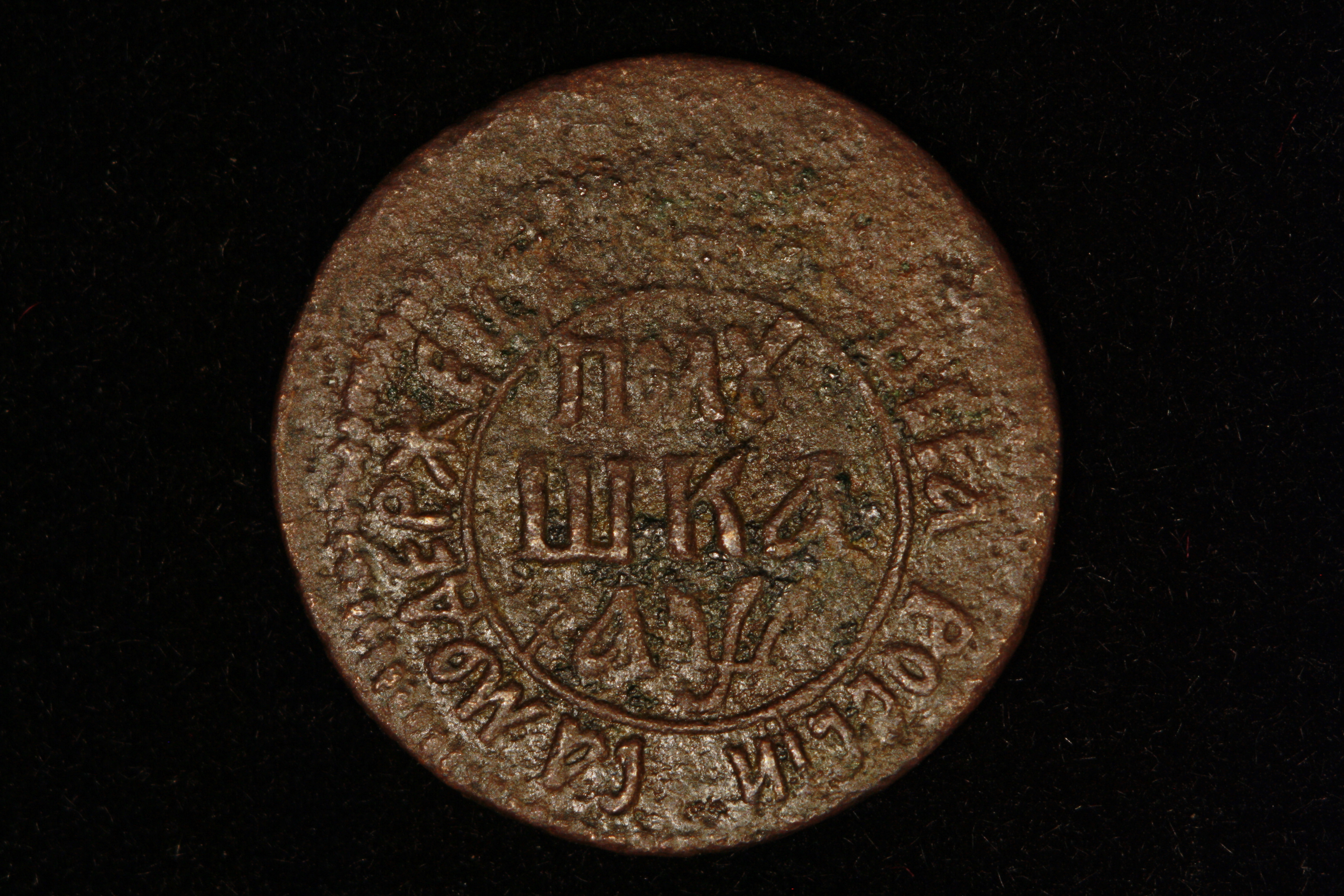
Reverse of a 1700 polushka. The word polushka is on two lines and the old Cyrillic date is below "҂АΨ" The legend reads "ВСЕЯ РОСИИ САМОДЕРЖЕЦ" or ...autocrat of all Russia. Minted at the Naberezhny mint in Moscow.

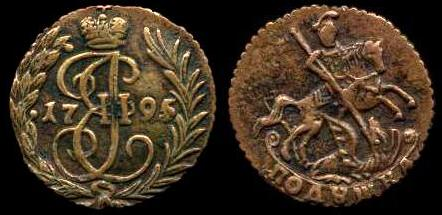
1795 Polushka minted under Catherine II (Catherine the Great)

A polushka (Russian: полушка, lit. 'half [of a denga]'), also historically known as a poludenga (Russian: полуденга), was a Russian coin with a value equal to 1/2 denga. Following the 1535 monetary reform of Elena Glinskaya, it had a value equal to 1/4 kopeck (100 kopecks = 1 ruble).

== History ==
The coin was minted from the 1390s in the Grand Principality of Moscow, specifically in Moscow, Serpukhov, Zvenigorod, Mozhaysk, and Dmitrov. It was also minted in the appanage principalities of Nizhny Novgorod and Rostov. From the late 15th century, it was also minted in Novgorod and Tver. At the time, it had a value of 1/2 moskovka (Moscow denga), with a weight of approximately 0.4g, with 400 polushkas being equal to a ruble.

The coins had images of horsemen, warriors, animals, and birds. The inscriptions on the coins bore the name of princes who issued the coin. There are also rare coins from the 14th and early 15th centuries that contain the inscription poldengi moskovskiye (Russian: полъденги московские, lit. 'Muscovite half-dengas'). The term poludenga is mentioned in written sources from the late 15th century.

In the centralized Russian state, it was the smallest silver coin. In the 16th and 17th centuries, the coins were issued with "P." simply shown as the denomination. Following the 1535 monetary reform of Elena Glinskaya, it was made equal to 1/4 kopeck with an approximate weight of 0.17g. The last silver coins were minted in the early 1680s, with an approximate weight of 0.09g.

From around 1700 to 1810 and from 1850 to 1867, copper coins with the inscription "P." were issued. From 1839 to 1846 and 1867 to 1916, such coins were issued with the denomination shown simply as 1/4 kopeck.

== Minting dates ==
- Peter the Great (1700–1716, 1718–1722)
- Anna of Russia (1730–1731, 1734–1740)
- Ivan VI of Russia (1741)
- Elizabeth Petrovna (1743–1751, 1754, 1757–1759)
- Catherine II of Russia (1766–1773, 1775, 1783–1796)
- Paul I of Russia (1797–1800)
- Alexander I of Russia (1803–1805, 1807–1808,1810)
- Nicholas I of Russia (1839–1846, 1849–1855)
- Alexander II of Russia (1855–1881)
- Alexander III of Russia (1881–1894)
- Nicholas II of Russia (1894–1900, 1909–1910, 1915–1916)

== See also ==
- Glossary of Russian currency

== Sources ==
- Gaydykov, P. G. (2015). "Полушка". In Osipov, Yu. S. (ed.). Большая российская энциклопедия. Том 27: Полупроводники — Пустыня. Moscow: Большая российская энциклопедия. p. 18. ISBN 978-5-85270-364-4. Archived from the original on 18 May 2026.
