= History of the Ukrainian hryvnia =

The Ukrainian hryvnia has been the national currency of Ukraine since 1996. It was briefly used in the Ukrainian People's Republic before the karbovanets was adopted as a national currency. The hryvnia is named after the grivna, which was used in Kievan Rus' and other states.

== Etymology ==
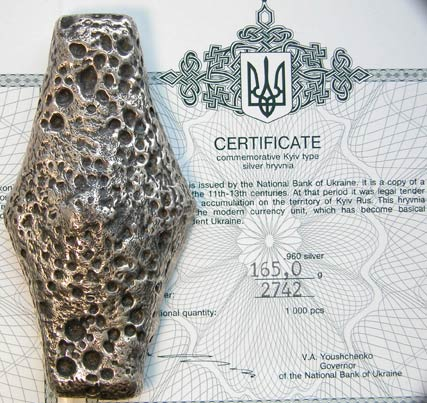
Kyiv hryvnia from the 11th or 12th century, reproduction by the National Bank of Ukraine

The word “hryvnia” in Kievan Rus' first meant a decoration worn at the nape of the neck, which often served as a measure of weight at the time. The first mention of "hryvnia" in the meaning of currency is found in "The Tale of Bygone Years" between 8th and 9th centuries. The chronicle relates that Prince Oleg the Prophet, coming from the North, began to rule in Kyiv and "established to give the Vikings from Novgorod three hundred hryvnias a year, for peace," indicating that in the hryvnia was used as a measure of weight and counting from the 8th to 9th centuries when conducting trade operations or paying tribute.

In the 11th century, the word "hryvnia" began to be used to refer to weight, with 11th century silver hryvnia coins weighing between 160 and 205 grams appearing in Kievan Rus'.

There were several types of hryvnias, with the most common in circulation called the Kyiv hryvnia. The Kyiv hryvnia existed before the Tatar invasion of Kievan Rus' and had a hexagonal shape which weighed 150 grams and was made of silver. In addition, there were the Novgorod hryvnias, initially known only in north-western lands. The Novgorod hryvnias had the appearance of long silver sticks and weighed 240 grams. The Chernihiv hryvnia was a transitional from the Kyiv hryvnia to the Novgorod hryvnia, and it's shape resembled that of the Kyiv hryvnia while its weight was close to the weight of the Novgorod hryvnia.

== History ==
=== Origins ===
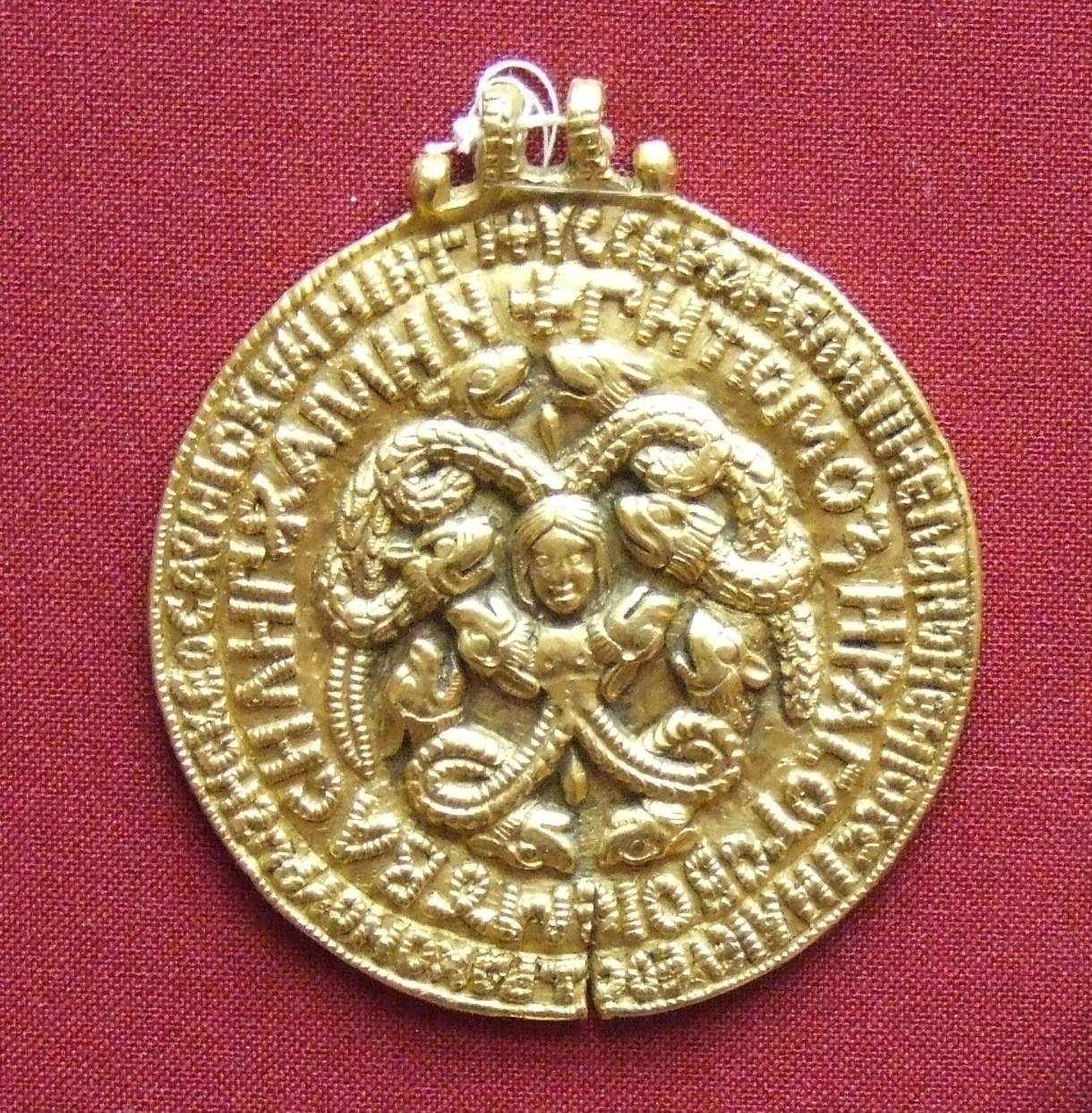
Chernihiv hryvnia, 11 century

The first money made of gold and silver in Ukraine were produced during the rule of Grand Prince of Kiev Vladimir the Great (Volodymyr the Great). These coins had an image of a trident which was used as a symbol of the princes of Kiev. The name of the coins were zlatnyks (gold coins) and sriblianyks (silver coins). The two sides of the golden coin depicted Prince Vladimir and Jesus Christ. The silver coins were minted by Kievan princes as well as in other principalities, including the Principality of Chernigov and Novgorod.

From the 12th to 14th centuries, Kievan Rus' began to decline, with the population and feudals began using silver ingots to replace the deficient gold or silver coins minted by the princes previously. In the mid-14th century, new coins started being minted, and they gradually went out of circulation and remained solely as a unit of counting.

=== 1917–1921 ===
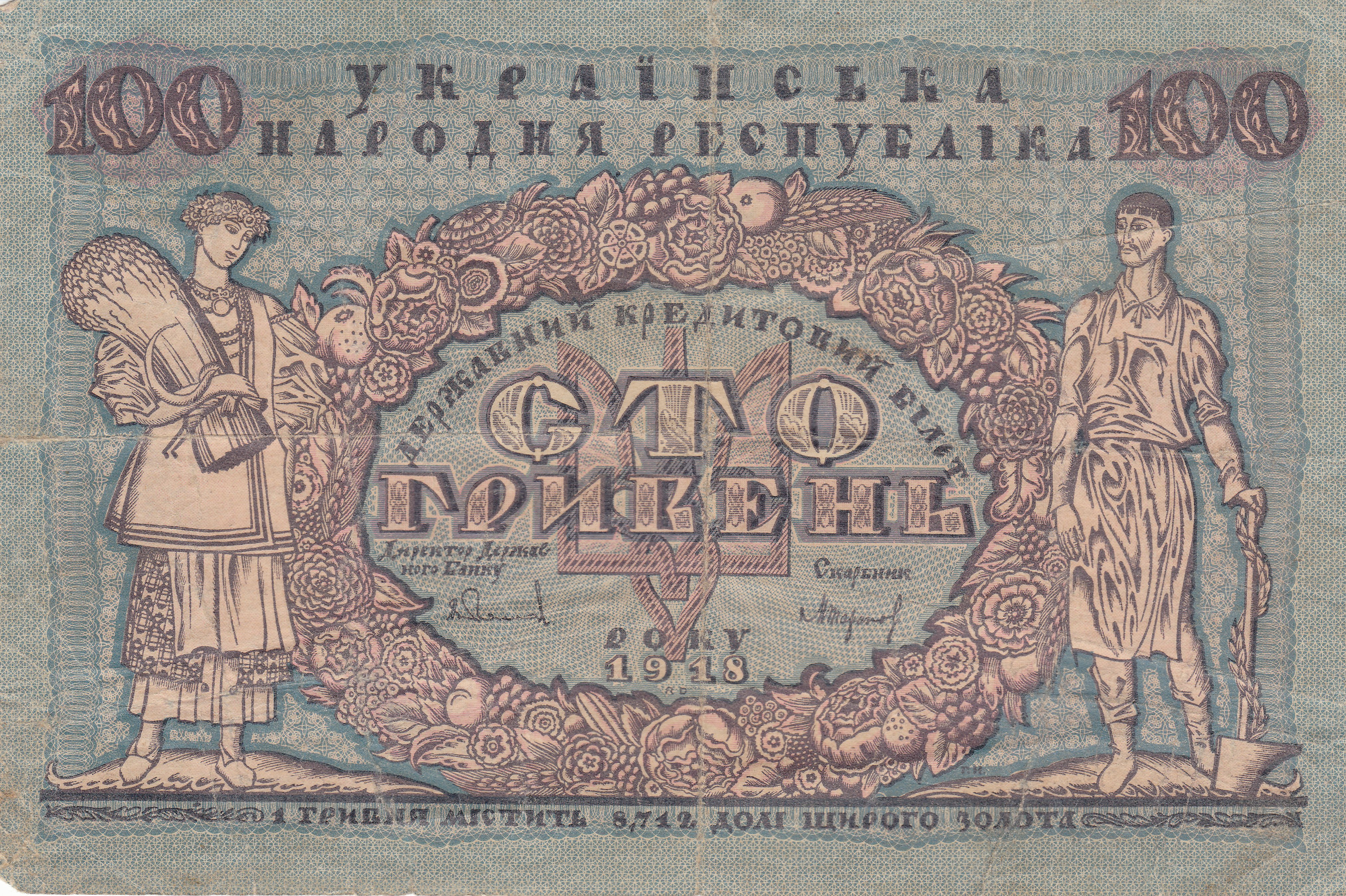
100 hryvnias banknote of the Ukrainian People's republic (1918)

During the Ukrainian Revolution in 1917–1921, the establishment of a national currency was a key priority of the Ukrainian state. On 22 December 1917, the Central Council established Ukraine's state bank. Mykhailo Kryvetskyi was appointed as the first director of the bank. He signed the first banknote (100 karbovanets banknote), issued by Ukrainian People's Republic, on 5 January 1918. One karbovanets equaled to 0.767 grams of gold.

In 100 karbovanets banknotes, a trident was included in the design as a reference to the gold and silver coins minted by Volodymyr the Great, which similarly depicted a trident as a major symbol.

On 1 March 1918, the Central Council introduced a new currency, the hryvnia, consisting of 100 shahs and equaled to 1/2 of the previously issued karbovanets banknote.

In April 1918, Hetman Pavlo Skoropadsky reintroduced the karbovanets as the main currency of Ukraine. It consisted of 200 shahs, and denominations of 10, 25, 50, 100, 250 and 1,000 karbovanets were issued.

=== Since 1991 ===
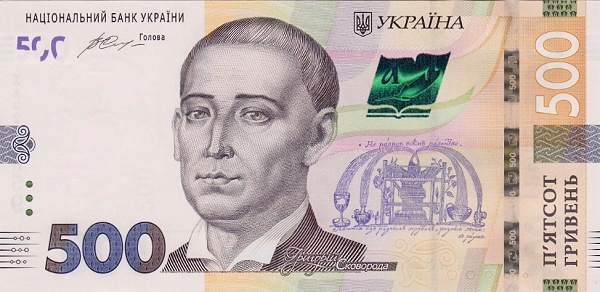
₴500 banknote

In 1991, the National Bank of Ukraine started emission of coupon karbovanets. In September 1996, a currency reform was performed by the National Bank of Ukraine and its head Viktor Yushchenko. As a result, a new currency called hryvnia was introduced.

The National Bank of Ukraine issued 1, 2, 5, 10, 20, 50, and 100 banknotes, and minted 1, 2, 5, 10, 25 and 50 kopiikas.

In early 2020, the National Bank of Ukraine issued 10, 20, 50, 100, 200, 500 and 1000 banknotes with a plan to stop issuing the 10-hryvnia banknote denomination in June and replacing it with a coin.

On 2 September 2024, the National Bank of Ukraine proposed to rename the kopiika to the historical shah as a part of the derussification campaign.

== See also ==
- List of currencies in Europe
