= Mauritanian ouguiya =

Currency of Mauritania

أوقية موريتانية (Arabic); Ouguiya (French)
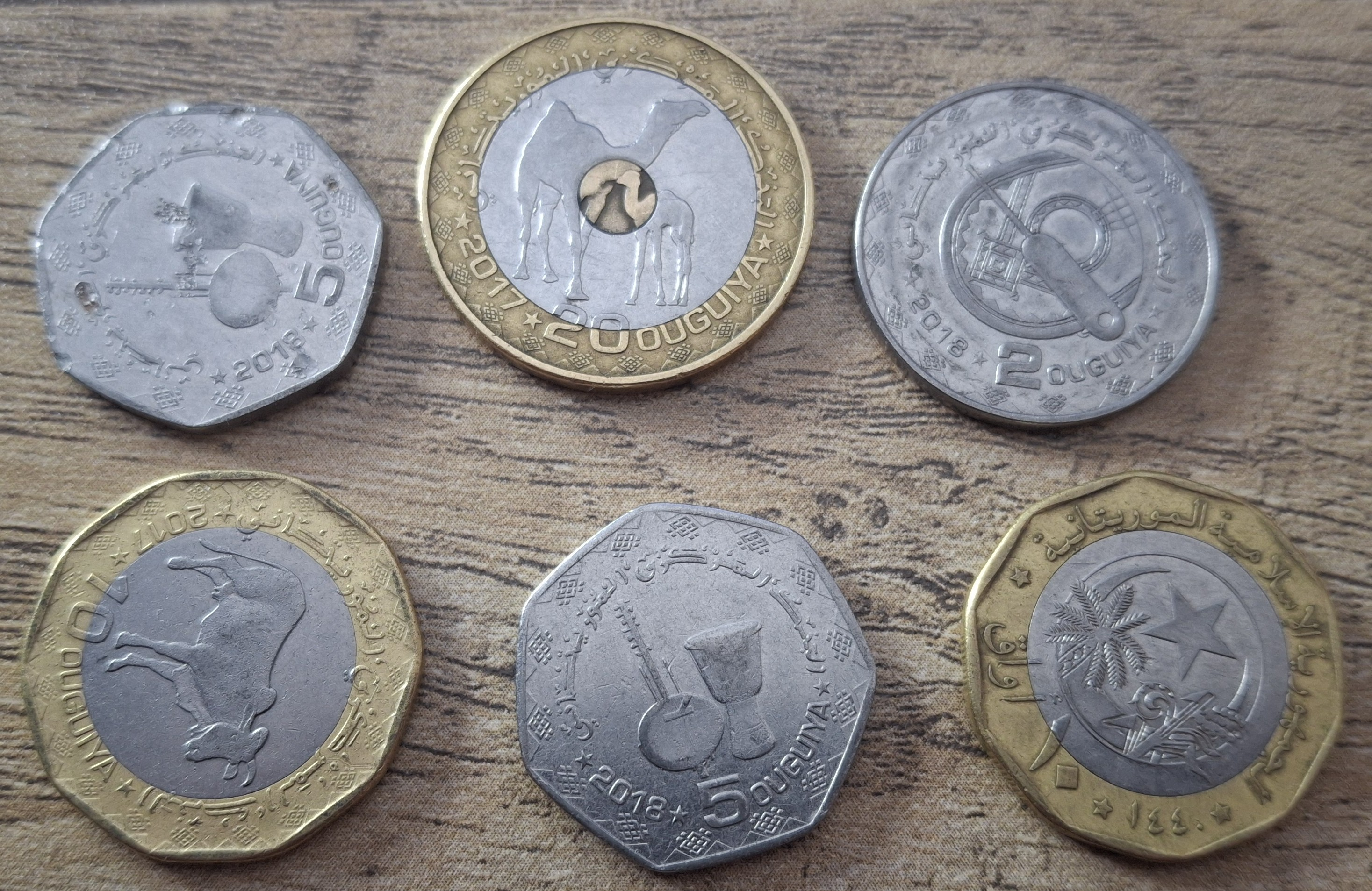
- Current coins

ISO 4217
- Code: MRU (numeric: 929) before 2017: MRO
- Subunit: 0.01

Units of account
- Plural: ouguiya
- Symbol: UM
- Subunit
- 1/5: khoums

Denominations
- Banknotes: 20, 50, 100, 200, 500, 1.000 ouguiya
- Coins
- Freq. used: 1, 2, 5, 10, 20 ouguiya
- Rarely used: 1 khoums

Demographics
- User(s): Mauritania (Western Sahara) Sahrawi Arab Democratic Republic

Issuance
- Central bank: Banque Centrale de Mauritanie
- Website: www.bcm.mr
- Printer: Canadian Bank Note Company
- Website: cbnco.com

Valuation
- Inflation: 2.2%
- Source: The World Factbook, 2019 est.

The ouguiya (Arabic: أوقية موريتانية (IPA: [u.ɡij.jə]); sign: UM; code: MRU), at one time spelled "ougiya", is the currency of Mauritania.

Each ouguiya constitutes five khoums (meaning "one fifth"). As such it is one of two circulating currencies, along with the Malagasy ariary, whose division units are not based on a power of ten. As of May 2026, the unit is effectively obsolete since the khoums has practically no purchasing power, and the coins have fallen into disuse.

The current ouguiya was introduced in 2018, replacing the old ouguiya at a rate of 1 new ouguiya = 10 old ouguiya, which in turn replaced the CFA franc at a rate of 1 old ouguiya = 5 francs. The name ouguiya (أوقية) is the Hassaniya Arabic pronunciation of uqiyyah أُوقِية), meaning "(Roman) ounce".

== First Ouguiya (MRO) ==
=== Coins ===
In 1973, coins of 1/5 (1 khoums), 1, 2, 5, 10 and 20 ouguiya were introduced into circulation. This was the only year that the khoums was minted, as the ouguiya was worth five CFA francs a khoums was the equivalent of the franc (which had no subdivision). The most recent issues were in 2003 (1 ouguiya) and 2004 (other denominations). Coins are minted at the Kremnica mint in Slovakia. The coinage slightly changed in 2009, with a reduced 1 ouguiya in plated composition and a bi-metallic 20 ouguiya issued. A bi-metallic 50 ouguiya was issued December 2010.

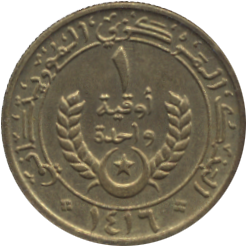
Obverse of 1 ouguiya coin, made of Aluminium bronze.

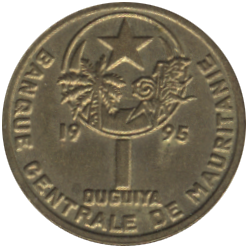
Reverse of 1 ouguiya coin, made of Aluminium bronze.

=== Banknotes ===
In 1973, notes were issued by the Central Bank of Mauritania (Banque Centrale de Mauritanie) in denominations of 100, 200 and 1,000 ouguiya. In 1974, a second series of notes was issued in the same denominations, with 500-ouguiya notes added in 1979. Banknotes have been printed by Giesecke & Devrient in Munich, starting with the second issue.

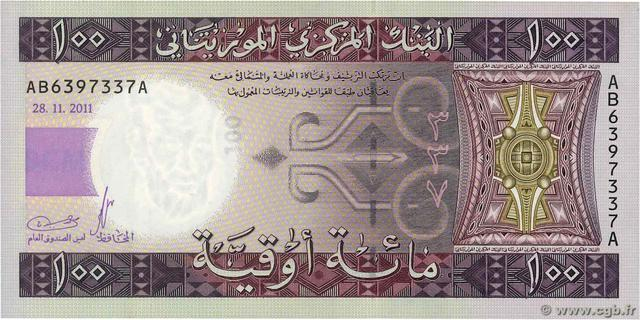
Obverse of 100 ouguiya note issued in 2011 with Eastern Arabic numerals. The reverse features text in French and Western Arabic numerals.

New banknotes were introduced in 2004. These notes have completely new fronts and the vignettes on the backs have been redesigned to accommodate the reduction in size. The 2,000-ouguiya denomination is entirely new.

A new 5,000-ouguiya denomination dated 28 November 2009 was introduced on 8 August 2010, followed by a redesigned 2,000-ouguiya note dated 28 November 2011 issued on 1 February 2012.

== Second ouguiya (MRU) ==
On 5 December 2017, the Central Bank of Mauritania announced a redenomination of its currency at a rate of 1:10. Reducing inflation and the risk of forgery were named as the main reasons behind this move. New coins and banknotes entered circulation on 1 January 2018. As a consequence of this change, the ISO Currency Codes for the ouguiya were amended to MRU / 929.

=== Coins ===
As part of the redenomination, a new series of coins were issued in denominations of 1 khoums (1/5 ouguiya), 1, 5, 10 and 20 ouguiya, with the latter being struck as a tri-metallic coin. A 2 ouguiya coin was added on 1 February 2019, serving as an intermediate denomination for the 1 and 5 ouguiya coins already in circulation.

Coins of the Mauritanian ouguiya (2017-2018 issue)
Image	Value	Technical parameters				Description			Date of first minting
Image	Value	Diameter	Thickness	Mass	Composition	Edge	Obverse	Reverse	Date of first minting
	1/5 ouguiya	16.0 mm (0.63 in)	2.0 mm (0.079 in)	2.10 g (0.074 oz)	Copper-plated steel	Plain/Smooth	National seal of Mauritania; denomination	Fish; denomination	2017
	1 ouguiya	19.9 mm (0.78 in)	2.0 mm (0.079 in)	4.00 g (0.141 oz)	Nickel-plated steel	Reeded/grained	National seal of Mauritania; denomination	Teapot; denomination	2017
	2 ouguiya	24.0 mm (0.94 in)		5.65 g (0.199 oz)	Stainless steel	Reeded/grained	National seal of Mauritania; denomination	National instruments; denomination	2018
	5 ouguiya	22.5 mm (0.89 in)	2.0 mm (0.079 in)	4.71 g (0.166 oz)	Nickel-plated steel	Plain/smooth	National seal of Mauritania; denomination	Instruments; denomination	2017
	10 ouguiya	24.0 mm (0.94 in)	1.8 mm (0.071 in)	5.38 g (0.190 oz)	Bi-metallic coin (Nickel-plated steel center with a Brass-plated steel ring)	Segmented (alternating between 10 plain and reeded sections)	National seal of Mauritania; denomination	Cow; denomination	2017
	20 ouguiya	26.0 mm (1.02 in)	2.0 mm (0.079 in)	7.63 g (0.269 oz)	Tri-metallic coin (Bronze-plated steel center plug with a Nickel-plated steel inner ring and a Brass-plated steel outer ring)	Plain/smooth	National seal of Mauritania; denomination	Camels; denomination	2017

=== Banknotes ===
As part of the redenomination, a new series of banknotes in denominations of 50, 100, 200, 500 and 1,000 ouguiya were introduced. These notes are printed entirely in polymer.

On 13 December 2021, the Central Bank of Mauritania issued a 20 ouguiya banknote, co-circulating with the coin of the same denomination in circulation.

In June 2023, the Central Bank of Mauritania issued a new 50 ouguiya banknote in celebration of 50 years of the circulation of the ouguiya in Mauritania, co-circulating with the previous banknote of the same denomination. This banknote was issued in three different varieties, each with a slightly different material composition. The different varieties are distinguishable by the first letter of their serial number (A, B or C). The Central Bank of Mauritania stated that this was intended as an experiment to assess which composition would be best suited to Mauritanias climate and the public. On 22 July 2025 a new 50 ouguiya banknote (serial number starting with "D" and slight design updates) was issued with the composition that turned out to be most suitable.

Banknotes of the MRU
Image		Value	Dimensions	Description			Date of			
Obverse	Reverse	Value	Dimensions	Obverse	Reverse	Watermark	printing	issue	withdrawal	lapse
		20 ouguiya	133 × 60 mm	Grand Mosque of Gataga in Kaédi	Guelb er Richât	(none)	28 November 2020	13 December 2021	Current	
		50 ouguiya	130 × 66 mm	Ibn Abass Mosque in Nouakchott	Musical instruments and teapot	(none)	28 November 2017	1 January 2018	Current	
		50 ouguiya	130 × 66 mm	Building of the Central Bank of Mauritania and Ibn Abass Mosque	Musical instruments and teapot	(none)	18 June 2023		Current	
		100 ouguiya	135 × 66 mm	Oualata Mosque	Cattle	(none)	28 November 2017, 28 November 2020	1 January 2018	Current	
		200 ouguiya	140 × 66 mm	Ouadane Mosque	Camels	(none)	28 November 2017	1 January 2018	Current	
		500 ouguiya	145 × 66 mm	Tichit Mosque	Trawler; fish	(none)	28 November 2017, 28 November 2020	1 January 2018	Current	
		1.000 ouguiya	150 × 66 mm	Chinguetti Mosque	Locomotive of an ore train	(none)	28 November 2017	1 January 2018	Current	
These images are to scale at 0.7 pixel per millimetre (18 pixel per inch). For table standards, see the banknote specification table.

=== Exchange rates ===
Current MRU exchange rates
From Google Finance:	AUD CAD CHF CNY EUR GBP HKD JPY USD
From Yahoo! Finance:	AUD CAD CHF CNY EUR GBP HKD JPY USD
From XE.com:	AUD CAD CHF CNY EUR GBP HKD JPY USD
From OANDA:	AUD CAD CHF CNY EUR GBP HKD JPY USD

== See also ==
- Economy of Mauritania
