= Kopeck =

Unit of currency

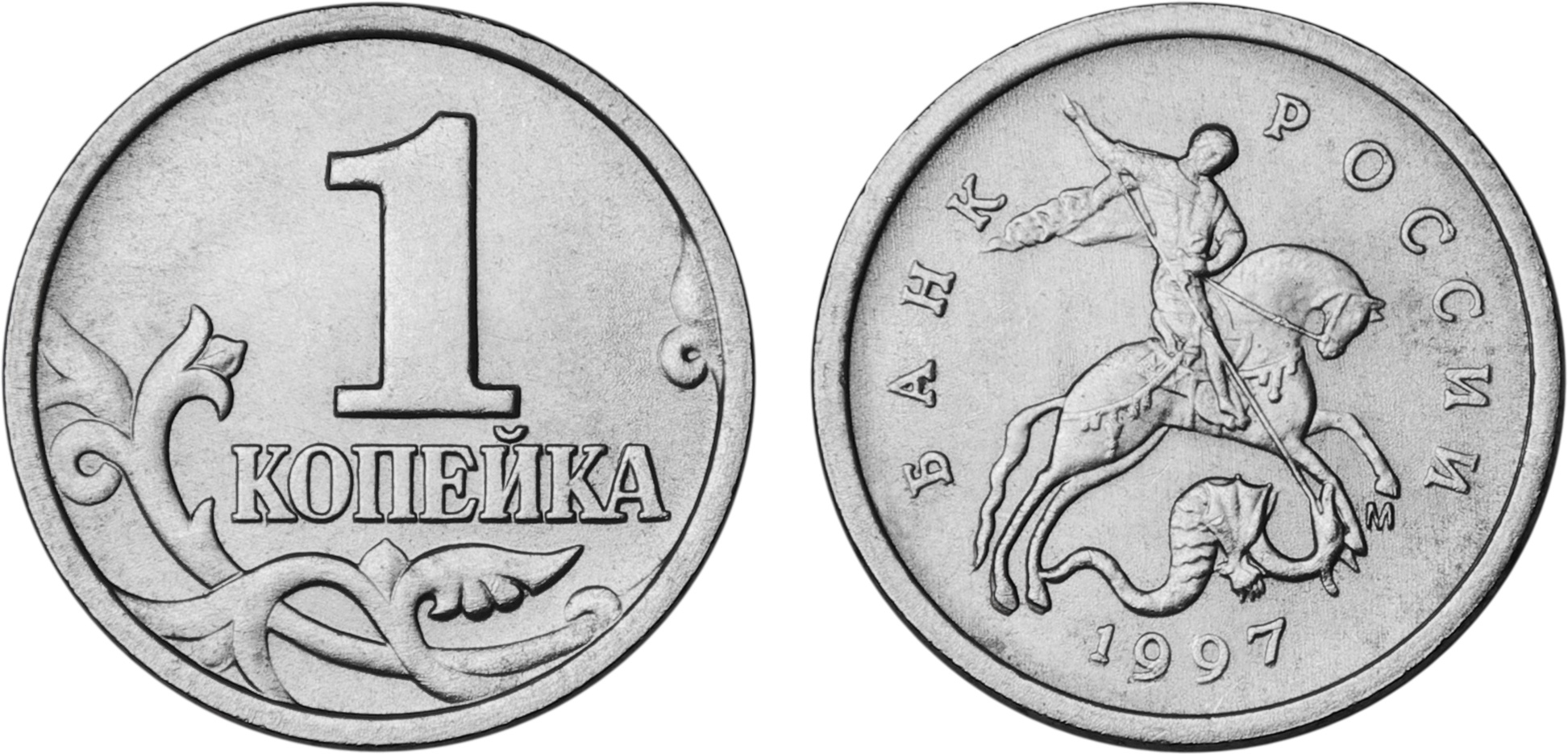
1997 kopeyka (Russia)

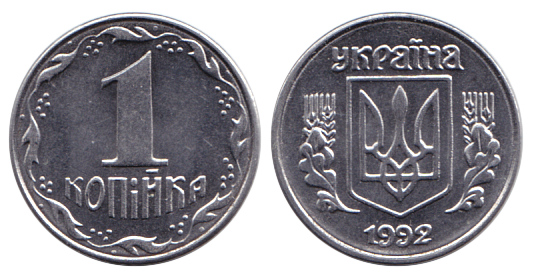
1992 kopiyka (Ukraine)

The kopeck, also spelled kopek, (Note: Multiple spellings depending on country: Russian: копейка, romanized: kopeyka, IPA: [kɐˈpʲejkə]; Ukrainian: копійка, romanized: kopiika, IPA: [koˈpijkə]; Belarusian: капейка, romanized: kapiejka) is a coin or unit of currency used in Russia and some post-Soviet states. It is usually the smallest denomination within a currency system and is equal to 1/100 ruble.

The kopeck was first introduced in Russia in 1535 as a result of the monetary reform of Elena Glinskaya, who was serving as regent. As of 2026, it is the currency unit of Belarus, Russia, and Ukraine. The Russian kopeck is also used in the two breakaway states of Abkhazia and South Ossetia. Transnistria, another breakaway state, has its own kopeck. In the past, several other countries had currency units that were also named kopecks as a result of Russian influence.

== Overview ==
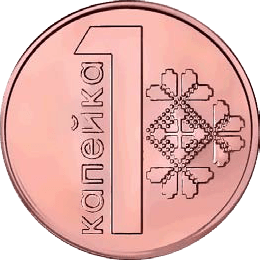
2009 kapiejka, reverse (Belarus)

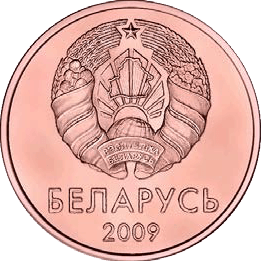
2009 kapiejka, obverse (Belarus)

The kopeck was introduced in Russia in 1535, where it is known as the kopeyka (pl. kopeyki). The name is derived from kopyo, meaning a lance or spear.

In Belarus, the equivalent name in Belarusian is kapeyka, in use since 1992. In Ukraine, it is known as the kopiyka (pl. kopiyok), in use since 1996.

It was also in use in Latvia from 1919 to 1922 and again from 1992 to 1993, where it was known as the kapeika. In Azerbaijan, the gapik (Azerbaijani: qəpik, 1/100 manat) is derived from the kopeck.

The kopeck is not subdivided in any country, although the denga (1/2 kopeck) and polushka (1/4 kopeck) were Russian coins that were periodically minted for centuries, until the fall of the Russian monarchy in 1917.

== History ==
The silver kopeck was introduced in 1535 as a result of the monetary reform of Elena Glinskaya, who was serving as regent for her son Ivan IV. It was equal in weight to the Novgorodian denga (novgorodka) at 0.68–0.69 grams, which had circulated throughout Russia from 1478. From 1535 to 1718, kopeck coins bore the image of a horseman carrying a spear (копьё, kopyo), hence the name kopek.

In 1610, its weight had fallen to 0.54–0.56 grams, then to 0.48–0.50 grams in 1613, 0.46–0.47 grams in 1626, 0.44–0.46 grams in 1645, and 0.38 grams in 1698. In 1610, during the Time of Troubles, Vasily Shuisky's government briefly began minting gold coins, including the kopeck. From 1656 to 1663, the government attempted to replace silver coins with copper coins, which led to their devaluation and ultimately the Copper Riot. In 1663, the minting of copper coins ceased. Peter I began minting copper coins again in 1704. The last wired silver coins (provolochnye kopeyki) were minted in 1718.

From 1704 to 1916, the obverse of the kopeck coin usually depicted a double-headed eagle or a horseman with a spear and the monarch's monogram, while the reverse contained the denomination or an image of a double-headed eagle and the denomination. As a result of the monetary reform of Peter I, the grivennik (10 kopecks) and poltina (50 kopecks) were introduced. Kopeck coins were minted almost annually from the reign of Catherine II.

During the Soviet period, the minting of kopeck coins resumed in 1924, and copper coins were issued. The obverse depicted the State Emblem of the Soviet Union and the motto "Workers of the world, unite!", while the reverse showed the denomination. The coins were later minted using cupronickel, brass, copper-nickel, aluminium-bronze, and billon.

As a result of the Russian monetary reform of 1997, new kopeck coins were minted, returning to the depiction of the horseman with a spear on the obverse and the denomination on the reverse. The kopeck also continued to be used in Belarus and Ukraine.

== Gallery ==
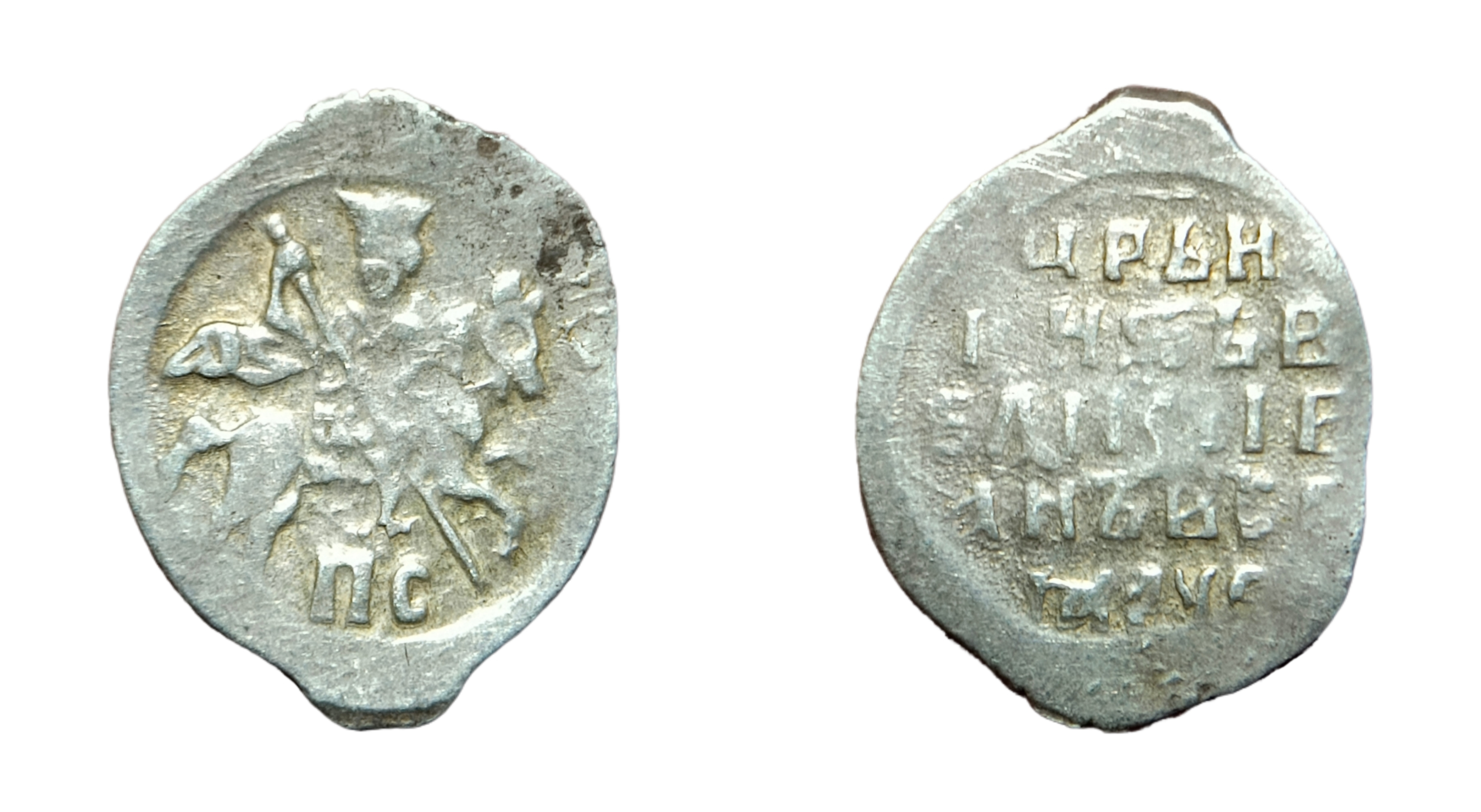
Kopeck of Ivan IV of Russia

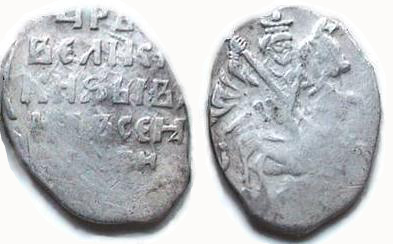
Kopeck of Ivan IV of Russia

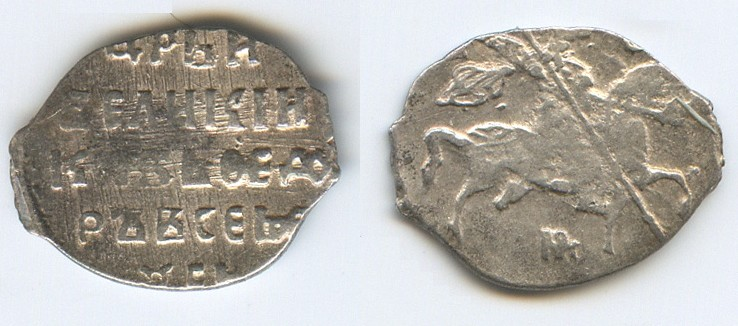
Kopeck of Feodor II, c. 1605

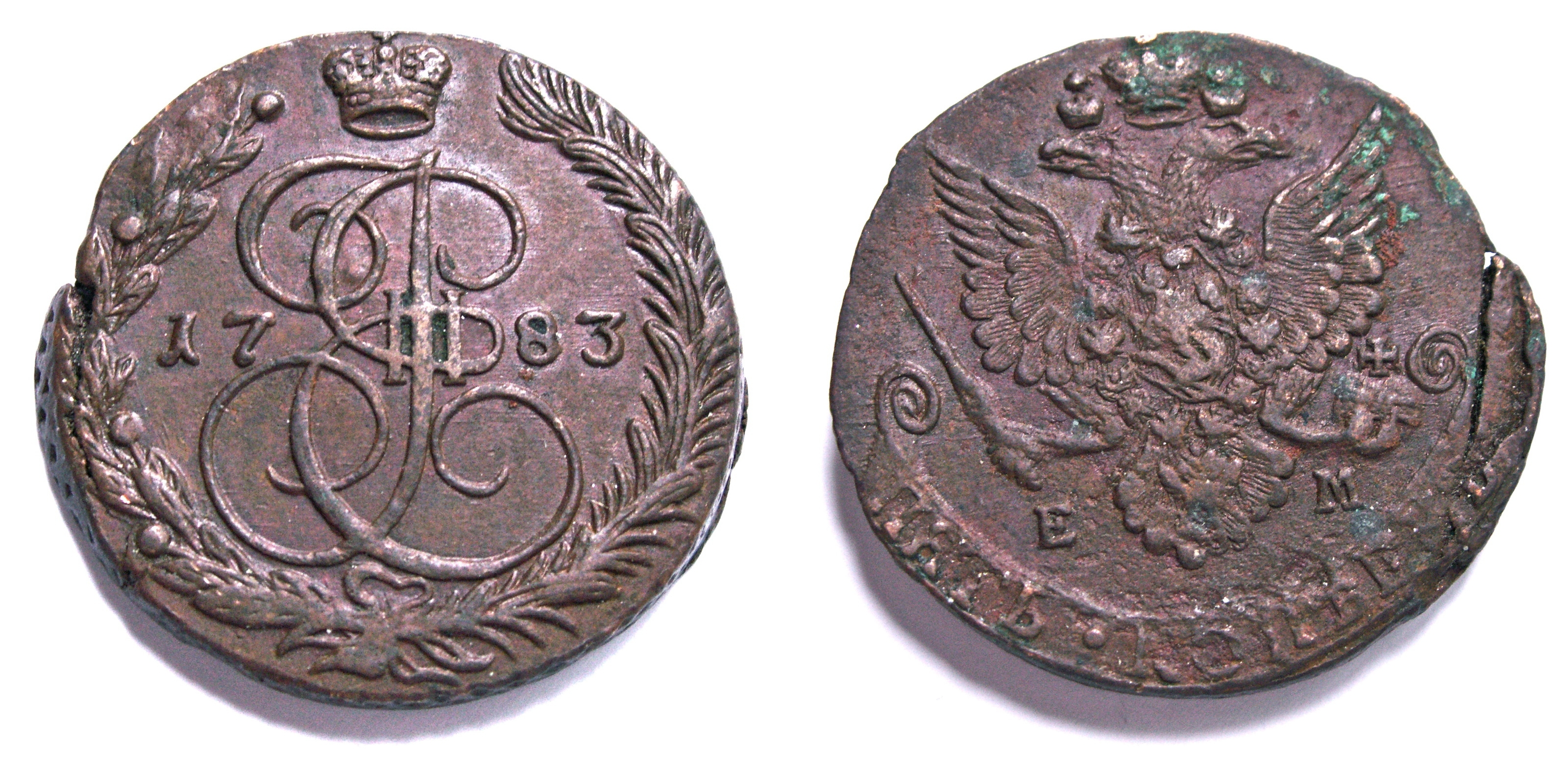
Copper five-kopecks coin of Catherine II, 1783

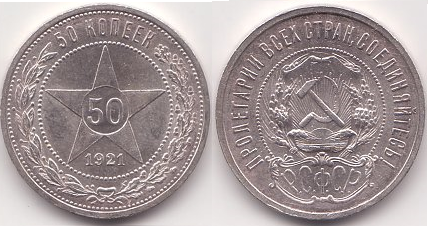
50-kopeck coin of the Russian SFSR, 1921

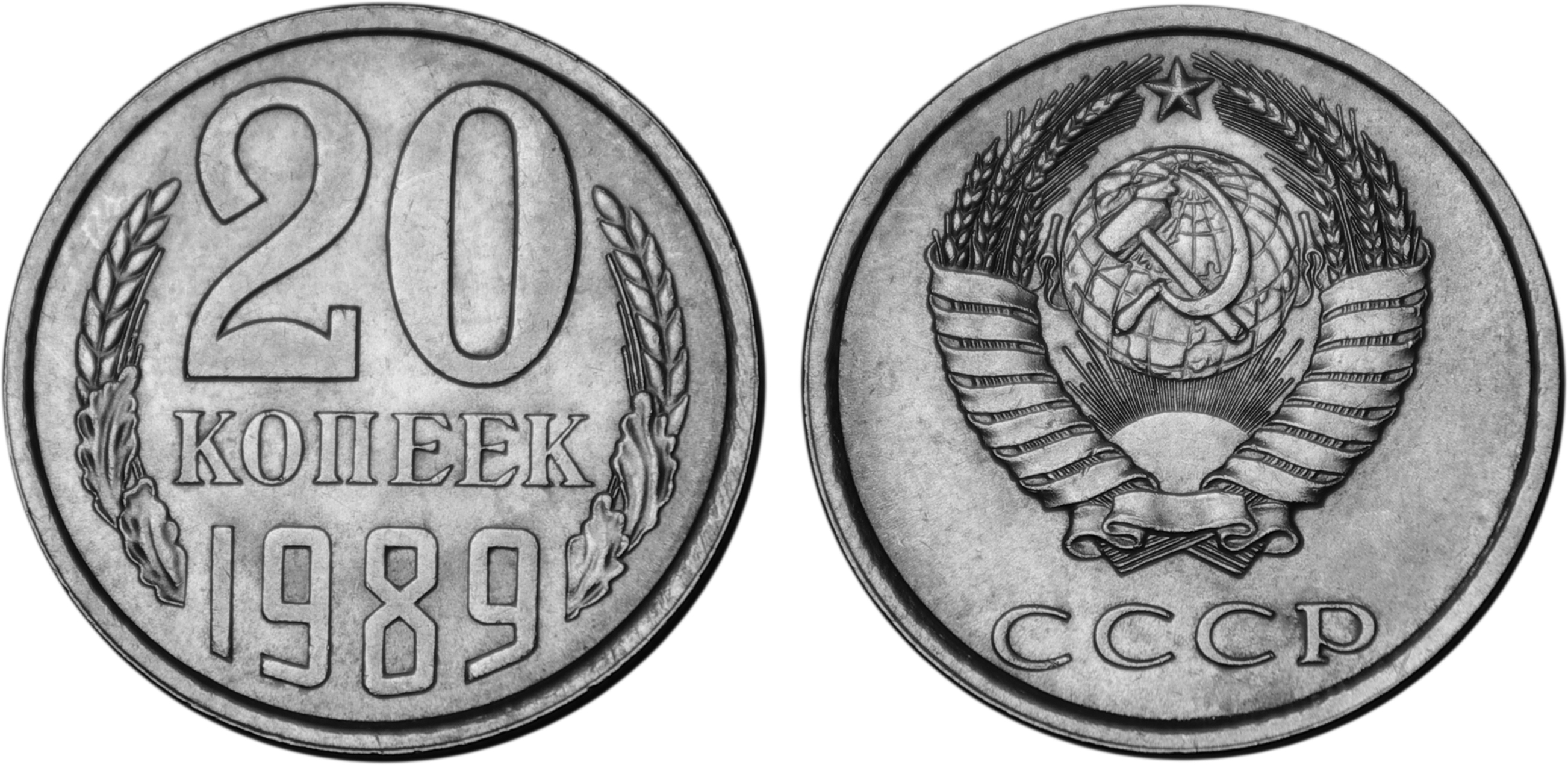
20-kopeck coin of the Soviet Union, 1989

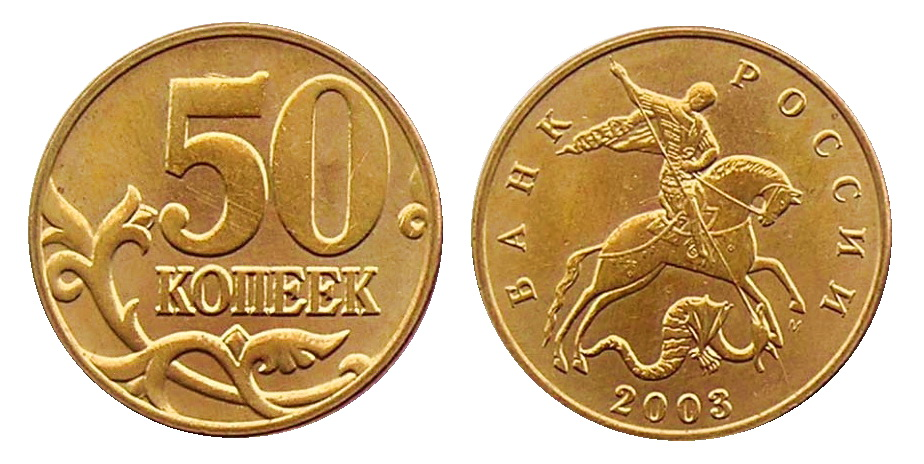
50-kopeck coin of the Russian Federation, 2003

== See also ==
- Glossary of Russian currency

== Sources ==
- Berlin, Howard M. (14 June 2015). World Monetary Units: An Historical Dictionary, Country by Country. McFarland. ISBN 978-1-4766-0673-6.
- Furasyeva, T. M. (2010). "Копейка". In Osipov, Yu. S. (ed.). Большая российская энциклопедия. Том 15: Конго — Крещение (in Russian). Moscow: Большая российская энциклопедия. pp. 200–201. ISBN 978-5-85270-346-0. Archived from the original on 24 April 2026.
