= Khoums =

The khoums (singular and plural in English; Arabic: خمس; lit. 'fifth') is the subdivisory unit of the Mauritanian monetary system, the ouguiya. Five khoums make an ouguiya, hence one khoums can be expressed as 0.2 ouguiya.

When the ouguiya was adapted in 1973, it replaced the CFA franc as 5 francs to the ouguiya, thus a khoums was equal to the franc. As the franc had no subdivisional unit, all wealths in francs could be converted to ouguiyas with no rounding. On the khoums coin (minted in Kremnica Mint, Slovakia), the obverse is in Arabic with the date of the Islamic calendar and the reverse in French in the Gregorian calendar with national arms on each side, identical to all other Mauritanian coins. However, on the Arabic side, instead of a number like on the other coins, the word خمس is used.

The khoums is one of only two subdivisions of currency that are not in a multiple of ten, and the only one still in everyday use; the other is the Malagasy iraimbilanja, also based on the franc.

As of 1 January 2023, the value of one khoums is about US$0.0054347846/¢0.54347846.
