= Denga =

Pre-1916 Russian monetary unit

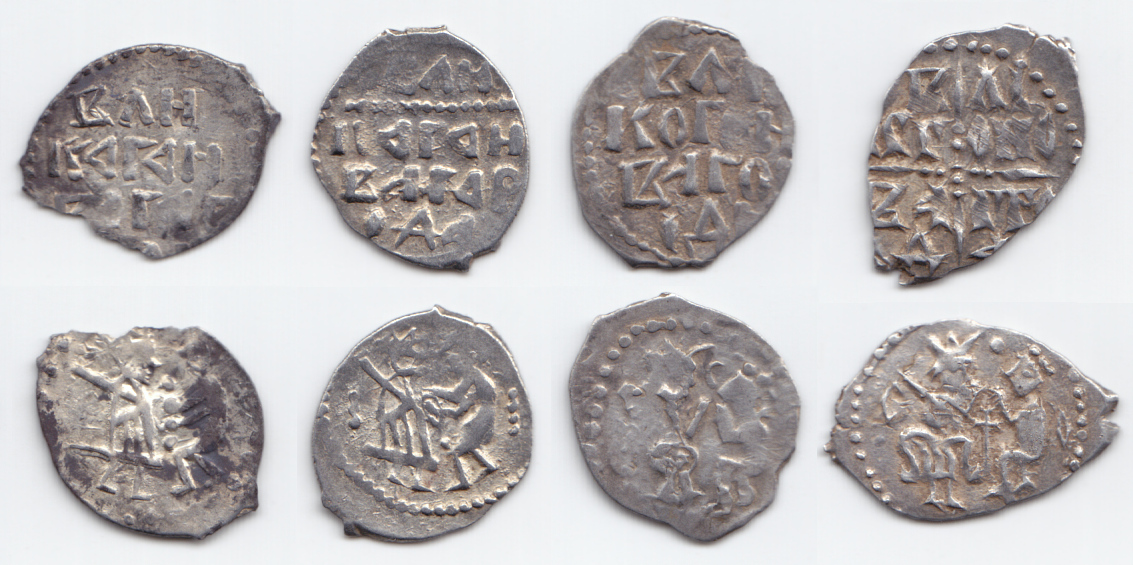
Four pre-reform dengi of the Novgorod Republic (novgorodki), 1420–1478.

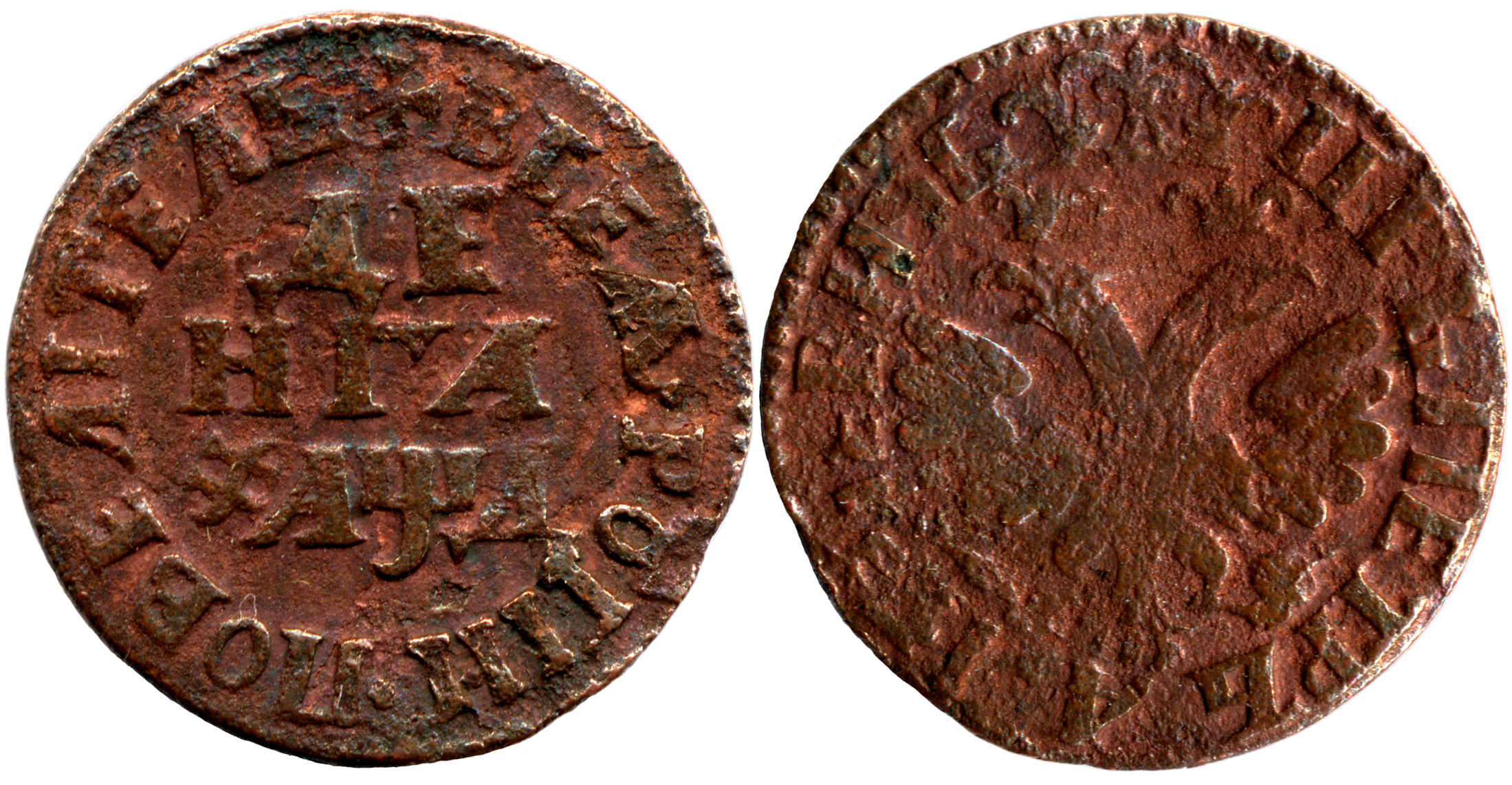
A copper denga minted during the reign of Tsar Peter I in 1704.

A denga (Russian: деньга, (Note: In earlier texts (until the end of the 18th century), it is spelled as "денга".) pl. деньги, dengi) was a Russian monetary unit with a value latterly equal to 1/2 kopeck (100 kopecks = 1 Russian ruble). The denga was introduced in the second half of the 14th century during the reign of Dmitry Donskoy.

== Etymology ==
The Russian word denga is borrowed from Tatar (cf. Chagatay: täŋkä; Kazakh: teŋgä; Mongolian: teŋge; lit. 'small silver coin'). Other proposals made are: Middle Persian: dāng, New Persian: dānag ('coin'), whereas other authors saw the word close to the Turkic word tamga ('mark, stamp').

The plural form of denga, dengi (деньги) has become the usual Russian word for "money".

== History ==
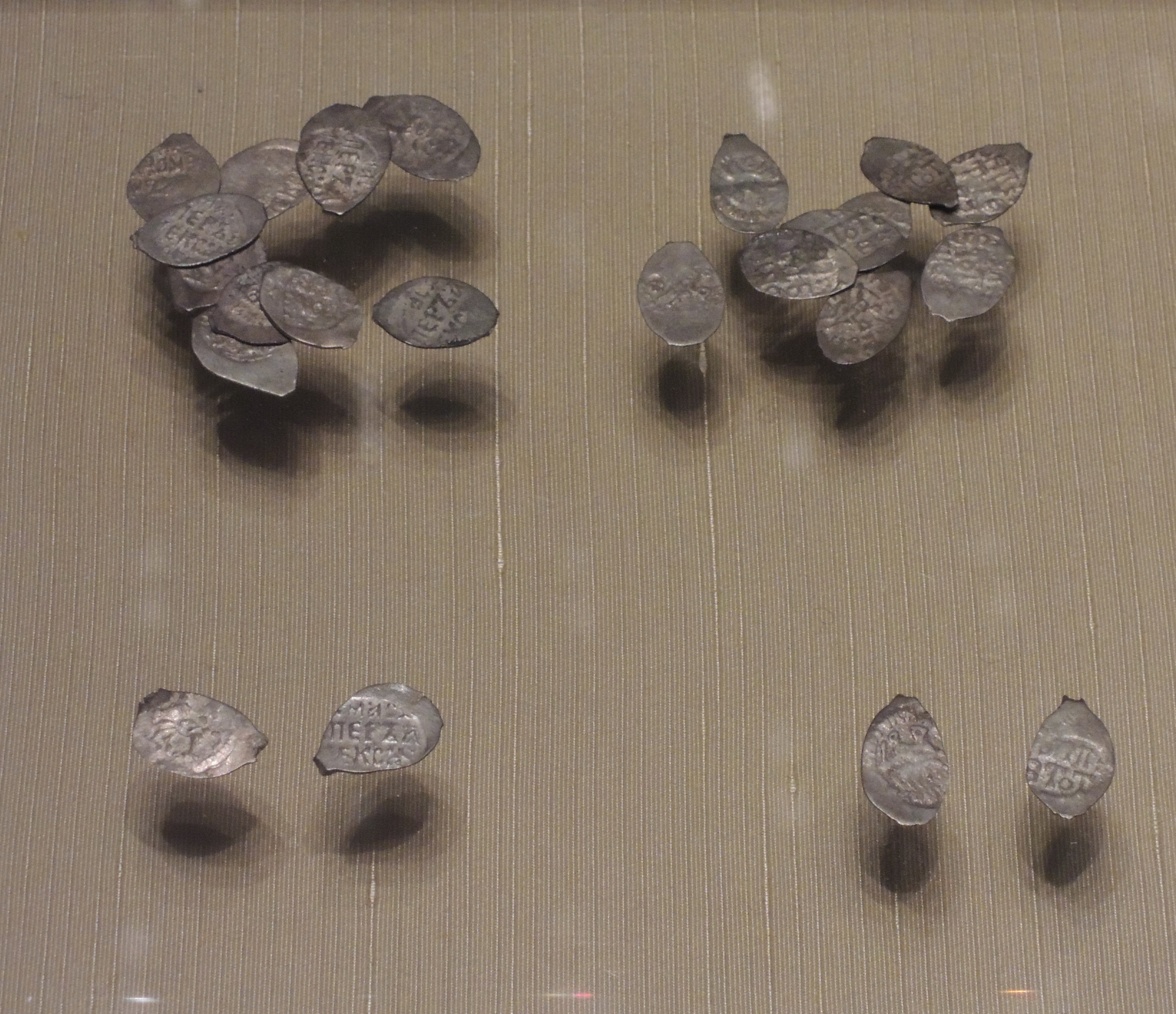
Pre-reform kopecks, dengi, and polushki minted during the reign of Tsar Ivan III in the 15th century.

Production of dengi as minted silver coins began in the second half of the 14th century, during the reign of Dmitry Donskoy, specifically in the 1370s and 1380s. They were first minted in Moscow and their introduction marked the end of the country's coinless period. They were also minted in Nizhny Novgorod and Ryazan. From the 1400s, they began to be minted in Tver. Initially, 200 dengi were made from one ruble, weighing about 1 gram.

In their earliest form, they were imitations of the silver coinage of the khans of the Golden Horde, usually bearing blundered or meaningless legends. Weighing about a gram, they were prepared by cutting silver wire into measured lengths, beating each length flat, and then striking the resulting blank between two dies. This resulted in slightly elongated coins, often showing traces of the original wire from which they had been taken. From Dmitry Donskoy's time onward, the coins began to take a more Russian form, with depictions of people, animals and Russian legends, although legends partly in Arabic (the official language of the Horde) persisted on some coins until the time of Ivan III.

The early dengi were made in the Russian principalities; the city-states of Novgorod and Pskov also began to mint their own denga coins in the 15th century. In the Pskov Judicial Charter, the general court fee (podsudnichye) is set to 10 dengi. 220 dengi were equivalent to one ruble and 30 grivny in Pskov. Uniformity in weight was introduced after the Grand Principality of Moscow was united with the other states in the late 15th century. For most of its history, six dengi was equal to one altyn, while 200 dengi was equal to one ruble.

In 1535, the monetary reform of Elena Glinskaya was introduced; the northern denga, known as the novgorodka, was valued at twice the southern denga, known as the moskovka, and the reform created a single monetary system for the entirety of the state. During the reigns of Ivan III and Vasili III, the value of money had dropped, with 260 novgorodki being minted out of one grivna. The novgorodka became known as the kopeck to convey the all-Russian significance of the unit. The new coins depicted a horseman with a spear (Russian: копьё, romanized: kopyo).

The minting of silver dengi seems to have decreased after the 16th century, as they are found less often in hoards, but they are known until the reign of Peter the Great. The purification of Russian coinage was not completed until Peter's monetary reform. By that time, the coinage had devalued so far that dengi weighed only about 0.14 grams, and were of little practical use. In the coinage reform of 1700 they reappeared as much larger copper coins, and mintage continued, off and on, until 1916, just before the Romanov dynasty was overthrown in 1917.

Coins minted in the 18th century invariably showed the denomination as denga, but during parts of the 19th century this was replaced by the word denezhka, the diminutive form of denga. Later still the denomination was shown simply as 1/2 kopeck.

== Post-reform silver denga mintage ==
- Ivan IV (1535–1584)
- Feodor I (1584–1594)
- Michael (1613–1645)
- Alexis (1645–1655, 1663–1676)
- Feodor III (1676–1682)
- Ivan V (during joint rule with Peter the Great) (1683–1696)
- Peter the Great (includes joint rule with Ivan V) (1683–1717)

Silver dengi were not minted during the last years of Feodor I's rule, nor during the Time of Troubles, though silver wire kopecks were minted throughout this period, including emissions by imposters and invaders.

== Copper denga mintage ==
During the time of Peter the Great, dengi transitioned from silver to copper, and from undated to Byzantine dates in Cyrillic to Julian dates in Cyrillic. After Peter's reign, dates were denoted using the common notation of Arabic numerals.

- Alexis (1654–1663, production ended in the aftermath of the Copper riot)
- Peter the Great (1700–1718)
- Anna Ioannovna (1730–1731, 1734–1740)
- Ivan VI of Russia (1741)
- Elizabeth Petrovna (1743–1754, 1757–1760)
- Peter III of Russia (1762)
- Catherine II of Russia (1764, 1766–1775, 1783–1796)
- Paul I of Russia (1797–1801)

== See also ==
- Glossary of Russian currency
- Tanka (coin)

== Sources ==
- Feldbrugge, Ferdinand J. M. (2 October 2017). A History of Russian Law: From Ancient Times to the Council Code (Ulozhenie) of Tsar Aleksei Mikhailovich of 1649. BRILL. ISBN 978-90-04-35214-8.
- Gaydykov, P. G. (2007). "Деньга". In Osipov, Yu. S. (ed.). Большая российская энциклопедия. Том 8: Григорьев — Динамика. Moscow: Большая российская энциклопедия. p. 542. ISBN 978-5-85270-338-5. Archived from the original on 25 April 2026.
- Johnston, Ruth A. (15 August 2011). All Things Medieval: An Encyclopedia of the Medieval World [2 volumes]. Bloomsbury Publishing USA. ISBN 978-0-313-36463-1.
- Kovalev, Roman K. (2004). "Denga". In Millar, James R. (ed.). Encyclopedia of Russian History. Macmillan Reference USA. p. 380. ISBN 978-0-02-865693-9.
- Pashkov, A. I. (26 October 2020) [1964]. "Ivan the Terrible's Principles of Economic Policy". A History of Russian Economic Thought. University of California Press. pp. 145–175. ISBN 978-0-520-31869-4.
- Snodgrass, Mary Ellen (12 August 2019). "Denga". Coins and Currency: An Historical Encyclopedia, 2d ed. McFarland. p. 87. ISBN 978-1-4766-7796-5.
- Uzdennikov V., Монеты России (1700—1917) [Coins of Russia (1700–1917)]. Издание третье. — М.: Collector's Books; IP Media Inc., 2004.
