= Grivna =

Weight and currency in Kievan Rus'

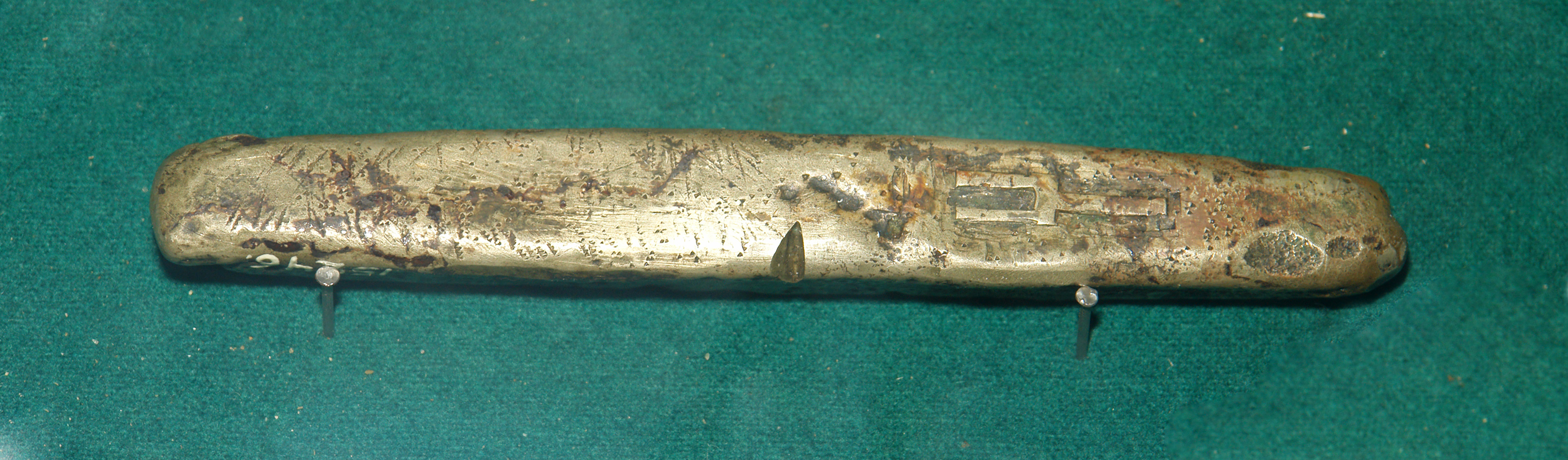
Round grivna (about 200 g (0.44 lb))

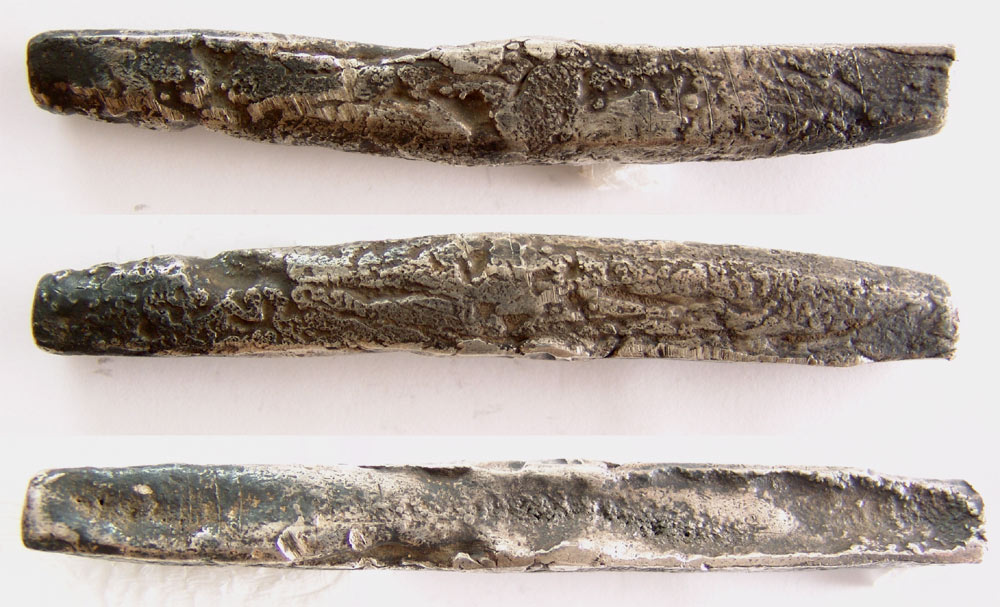
Triangular Novgorod grivnas excavated near Koporye

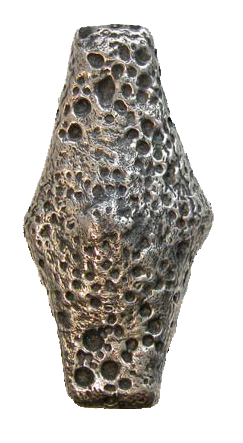
Kievan rhombic grivna

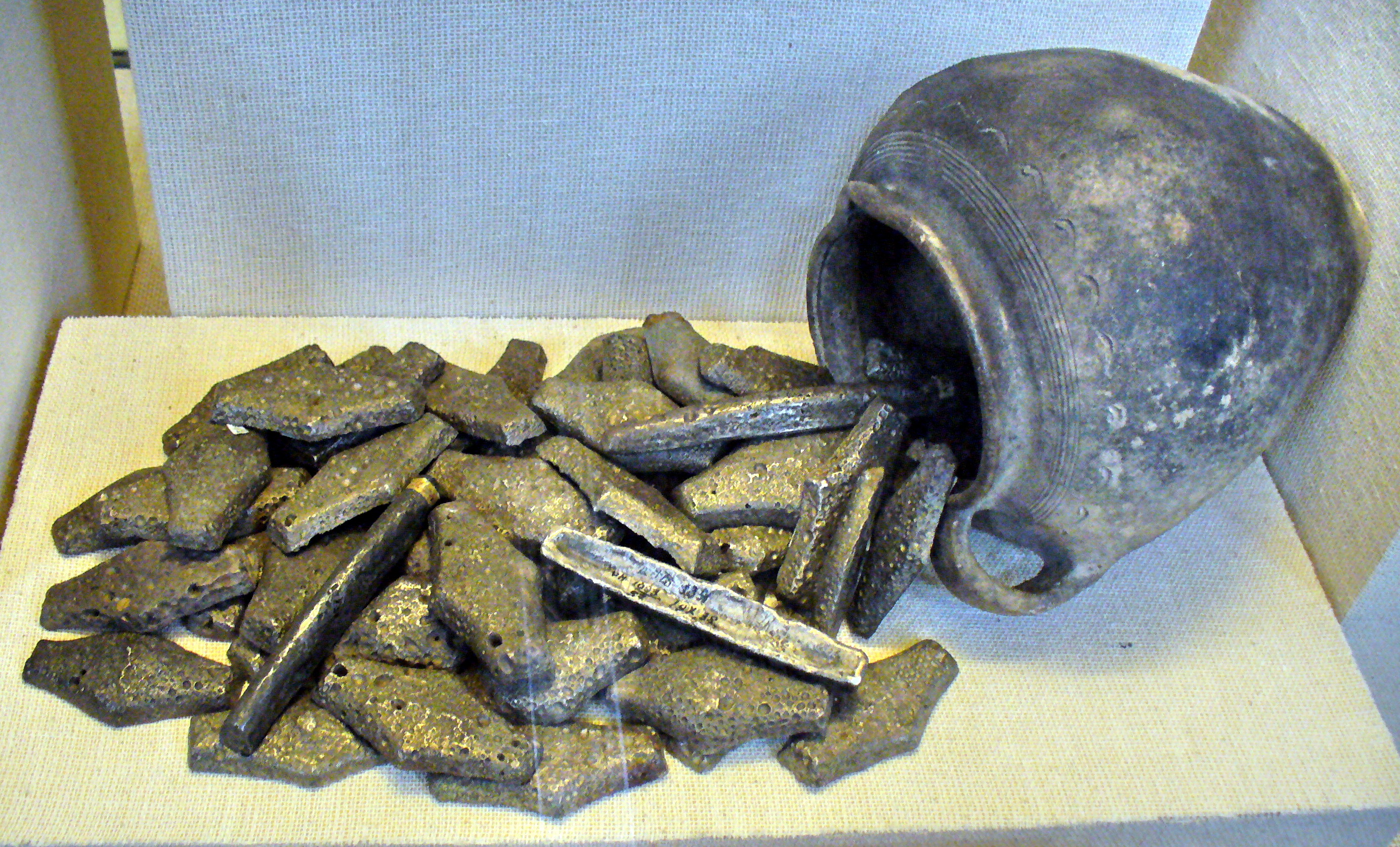
A hoard of rhombic Kievan grivnas at Moscow State Historical Museum

The grivna (Old East Slavic: гривьна) was a currency as well as a measure of weight used in Kievan Rus' and other states in Eastern Europe from the 11th century.

== Name ==
The word grivna is derived from *grivĭna 'necklace' from *griva 'neck, nape, mane'. In Old East Slavic, it had the form гривьна, grivĭna. In modern East Slavic languages it has such forms: Belarusian: гры́ўня, hryŭnia, Russian: гри́вна, grivna, Ukrainian: гри́вня, hryvnia.

The name of the contemporary currency of Ukraine, hryvnia, is derived from the grivna.

== History ==
=== Early history ===
As its etymology implies the word originally meant a necklace or a torque. The reason why it has taken the meaning of a unit of weight is unclear. The grivnas that have been found at various archaeological sites are not necklaces but bullions of precious metals, usually silver. The weight and the shape of grivnas were not uniform, but varied by region. The grivnas of Novgorod and Pskov were thin long round-edged or three-edged ingots, while Kievan grivnas have rather the shape of a prolonged rhombus. The material was either gold or silver, but silver was predominant. Originally the weight of a grivna was close to the Roman or Byzantine pound. The weight of the Kievan grivna was around 140–165 g (0.309–0.364 lb). The Novgorod grivna had the weight 204 grams (0.450 lb) and became the basis for monetary systems in northeastern Rus', including the emerging Grand Duchy of Moscow.

Alongside the "grivna of silver" there was the "grivna of kuna". The latter originally signified a certain amount of marten furs (куна kuna was the word for "marten" in Church Slavonic). Since the 12th century, the "grivna of kuna" became another unit of weight, but smaller, and signified as well a certain amount of silver coins: 2.5-gram nogata (from Arabic: نقد naqd 'money; a coin') and rezan (1/2 dirham).

1 grivna of silver (204 g) = 4 grivnas of kuna (51 g) = 80 nogata coins = 100 kunas (marten furs) = 200 rezans = 400–600 vekshas (squirrel furs)

=== Later history ===
Since the 14th century, when coins started to be minted in northeastern Rus' (firstly in Moscow), the currency system of silver bullions and furs was becoming obsolete. The grivna became to mean not a weight but rather a particular number of silver coins called then denga. At the same time as early as the 13th century the word ruble (rubl') started to be used alongside the word grivna to mean a certain amount of either silver or silver coins. Thus one account ruble was equal to 216 denga coins (each weighted about 0.8 gram). The grivna of kuna became simply grivna and was equal to 14 dengas. Thus one ruble was equal to 15 new grivnas and 6 denga coins.

The weight of a denga coin in Moscow and Novgorod was different. In the 15th century, the Moscow denga fell as low as 0.4 gram, while the Novgorod denga remained the same. When in Moscow one ruble had been revalued to 200 denga coins, the exchange rate between Moscow and Novgorod denga coins was set to 2 to 1. Thus since the later 15th – the early 16th centuries one account ruble was equal to 100 Novgorod dengas (later known as kopeks) or to 200 Moscow dengas. In this system one grivna was equal to 10 kopeks or 20 dengas.

This last meaning survived into the 18th to 20th centuries when one grivennik or grivenka meant a 10-kopek coin.

== Weight ==
The grivna as a silver bullion currency did not survive, but its meaning as a unit of weight became predominant. In 15th–17th centuries there were two weight grivnas (or grivenkas): the lesser grivna of 204.756 g (6.5831 ozt) and the greater grivna of 409.512 g (13.1661 ozt). Since the middle of the 17th century the latter became known as the Russian pound (Фунт, funt). 40 Russian pounds or 80 lesser grivnas (grivenkas) are equal to one pood.

== See also ==
- Obsolete Russian units of measurement
- Manilla
- History of Ukrainian hryvnia
