= List of people from Lawrence, Massachusetts =

This is a list of people from Lawrence, Massachusetts.

- Laurence A. Abercrombie, triple Navy Cross recipient, admiral, and submariner
- A. J. Antoon, Tony Award-winning theatre director
- Sarah Lord Bailey (1856–1922), elocutionist and teacher
- Fred Beal, labor-union organizer
- Al Bernardin, inventor of the Quarter Pounder
- Leonard Bernstein, composer, pianist, conductor of New York Philharmonic, winner of a Tony Award and 18 Grammy Awards, born in Lawrence
- Colin Blackwell, professional ice hockey player
- Johnny Broaca, professional baseball player
- DJ Buddha, multi-platinum and multi-award winning record producer, DJ and record label owner
- Patrick F. Burke, American football player
- Garrett Caples, poet
- Doc Casey, professional baseball player
- James A. Champy, author, management expert, retired CEO
- Ed Coleman, radio reporter, host for the New York Mets
- John William Comber, Catholic missionary and bishop
- Elaine Comparone, harpsichordist
- Bill Cronin, American football player
- Irene Daye, jazz singer
- Ferdinand Waldo Demara, "The Great Impostor"
- Anthony DeSpirito, jockey
- Marcos Devers, served briefly as interim mayor of Lawrence, Massachusetts, becoming the first Dominican-American to hold the office.
- William E. Donovan, MLB pitcher and manager
- Sully Erna, Godsmack lead singer
- Aaron Feuerstein, one of the CEOs of Malden Mills; known for his generosity, for which he was awarded the Peace Abbey Courage of Conscience Award
- L. J. Figueroa (born 1998), Dominican-American basketball player in the Israeli Basketball Premier League
- Joseph D. FitzGerald, president of Fairfield University (1951–1958)
- Jocko Flynn, MLB pitcher
- Robert Frost, iconic poet, winner of four Pulitzer Prizes and a Congressional Gold Medal, graduate of Lawrence High School
- Ziwe Fumudoh, comedian and comic writer
- Robert Goulet, Grammy-winning singer and Tony-winning actor, born in Lawrence
- Andrew Haldane, US Marine Corps officer
- Steve Holman, voice of the Atlanta Hawks
- Nicky Jam, birth name Nick Rivera Caminero, rapper and reggaeton artist, lived in Lawrence until age 10
- John J. Joubert (1963–1996), serial killer
- Francis Kilcoyne (died 1985), president of Brooklyn College
- William S. Knox, US congressman 1895–1903
- Thomas J. Lane, U.S. congressman 1941–1963
- Abbott Lawrence, founder of Lawrence, U.S. congressman, and ambassador to the United Kingdom
- Anna LoPizzo, striker killed during the Lawrence textile strike
- Luny Tunes. reggaeton duo
- Sal Maccarone, sculptor
- Ray MacDonnell, actor
- Robert S. Maloney, U.S. congressman 1921–1923
- Paul R. McHugh, psychiatrist
- Frank McManus, MLB catcher
- Robbie Merrill, Godsmack bassist
- Paul Monette, author, poet, and activist
- George Moolic, professional baseball player
- Ray Mungo, author of 18 books and co-founder of Liberation News Service
- Georges Niang, professional basketball player
- Jane Ellen "Bonnie" Newman, executive dean of Harvard's Kennedy School and president of the University of New Hampshire
- John O'Connell, professional baseball player
- Henry K. Oliver, treasurer of Massachusetts 1886–1889
- Endicott Peabody, governor of Massachusetts 1963–1965
- Leo Z. Penn, actor and director, father of Sean Penn
- Joe Perry, guitarist of Aerosmith
- Elizabeth Pillion, Army chemist
- Raymond Preston, NFL linebacker
- William Quinlan, NFL defensive end
- Reks, rapper
- Gil Reyes, boxer, WBA, Fedecentro welterweight champion
- William Herbert Rollins, pioneer in field of radiation protection
- Dave Rozumek, NFL player
- William A. Russell, U.S. congressman 1879–1885
- Statik Selektah, record producer, DJ and radio personality
- James Michael Shannon, attorney general of Massachusetts and CEO of National Fire Protection Association
- Edgar J. Sherman, attorney general of Massachusetts and Associate Justice of the Massachusetts Superior Court
- Bethann Siviter, expatriate British nurse leader and author
- John K. Tarbox, U.S. congressman 1875–1877 and mayor of Lawrence 1873–1875
- Termanology, rapper
- Ernest Thayer, writer and poet, "Casey at the Bat"
- Thelma Todd, actress
- Emily Greene Wetherbee, poet and educator
- John E. White, auditor of Massachusetts 1911–1914
- Michael C. Wholley, general counsel for NASA
- William M. Wood, co-founder of American Woolen Company
