= Elizabeth Pillion =

American chemist

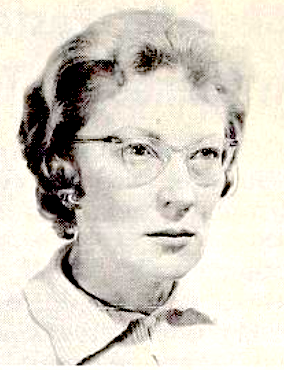
- Elizabeth Pillion, from a 1962 publication of the United States Army
- Born: Elizabeth Lynch; January 18, 1921; Lawrence, Massachusetts
- Died: June 8, 1990 (aged 69); Methuen, Massachusetts
- Occupation: Chemist

Mary Elizabeth Lynch Pillion (January 18, 1921 – June 8, 1990) was an American chemist with the United States Army from the late 1940s into the 1970s.

== Early life ==
Elizabeth Lynch was from Lawrence, Massachusetts, the daughter of Michael Francis Lynch and Abigail F. Scott Lynch.

== Career ==
Pillion was a chemist at the United States Army's Quartermaster Research and Engineering Command in Natick, Massachusetts. Much of her work involved studying storage and cleaning methods for feeding and hydration systems in extreme environments. In 1962 she received the Research Directors' Award for her work on a spectrophotometric correction technique for identifying ingredients in disinfectants and other solutions.

Pillion's research was published in scholarly journals including Analytical Chemistry, Journal of Chromatographic Science, Military Medicine, and Applied Microbiology.

== Selected publications ==
- "Military individual and small group water disinfecting systems: an assessment" (1977, with Morris R. Rogers, Arthur M. Kaplan, and Joseph J. Vitaliano)
- "Prevention of Food Residue Spoilage in Waste Packaging from Feeding Systems Utilized by Personnel Operating in a Closed Gaseous Environment Requirement Number AF 4-12" (1975, with Morris R. Rogers, Arthur M. Kaplan, and Joseph J. Vitaliano)
- "Resistance of Weathered Cotton Cellulose to Cellulase Action" (1970, with Arthur M. Kaplan, Mary Mandels, and Marvin Greenberger)
- "Long-term Storage Study of Disinfectant, Germicidal, and Fungicidal" (1965, with Morris R. Rogers and Arthur M. Kaplan)
- "Gas Chromatography of Phenylphenols and Chlorophenylphenols on a Silicone Nitrile Column" (1965)
- "Absorptivity Correction in Multicomponent Spectrophotometric Analysis" (1961, with Morris R. Rogers and Arthur M. Kaplan)
- "Effects of Local Cooling on Finger Blood Flow in Individuals Exposed to Warm Ambient Temperature" (1951, with Mortimer Eugene Bader and Jere Mead)
- "The Inhibition of Frostbite Wheals by the Iontophoresis of Antihistaminic Agents" (1949, with Martin B. Macht and Jere Mead)
- "Peripheral vascular effects produced by localized warming of various skin areas" (1948, with M. E. Bader, and M. B. Macht)
- "The Effects of Various Amino Acids on Peripheral Blood Flow and Skin Temperature" (1948, with M. B. Macht)
- "Changes in skin temperature and blood flow of hand following ingestion of certain amino acids" (1948, with M. B. Macht)
- "Control of Peripheral Blood Flow: Responses in the Human Hand when Extremities are Warmed" (1947, with B. G. Ferris, R. E. Forster, and W. R. Christensen)

== Personal life ==
Elizabeth Lynch was married to John William Pillion, an Army physician. She lived in Andover, Massachusetts. She died in 1990, in Methuen, Massachusetts.
