= List of alternative names for currency =

This is a list of alternative names for currency. A currency refers to money in any form when in actual use or circulation as a medium of exchange, especially circulating banknotes and coins. A more general definition is that a currency is a system of money (monetary units) in common use, especially in a nation.

== Alternative names for currency ==
=== English Currency (Cockney Rhyming Slang) ===
- Generic Term: "bread" from "Bread & Honey" for "Money"
- £5: "Lady Godiva" or "fiver"
- £10: "cockle" from "Cock & Hen" or "tenner"
- £1000: "bag" from "Bag of Sand" for "grand"

=== Other ===
- Aussie – Australian dollar
- Bank
- Benjamins
- Benjie – a name for a USD $100 bill that was sometimes tucked away by touring deadheads for emergency use
- Bills
- Bones
- Bread
- Buck/bucks
- C-note - slang for $100 bill (for the Roman numeral C, meaning 100)
- Cabbage
- Cheddar
- Clams
- Coin
- Cream
- Chips
- Dead presidents
- Dosh
- Dough
- Fiver – £5 note, US$5 bill
- Grand – £1,000, US$1,000
- Greenbacks
- Green Stuff
- Gs – Increments of US$1,000
- Jackson – USD $20 bill
- Kiwi – slang term for the currency of New Zealand
- Large – £1,000, US$1,000
- Lettuce
- Loonie – refers to the Canadian dollar, because the Canadian dollar coin has an image of the common loon on its reverse side
- Loot
- Moolah
- P – money, pennies
- Perak – Indonesian rupiah for coin, derivative from silver.
- Quid – Pound sterling
- Racks – large sums of money, 10 of these make one stack
- Rocks – coins
- Sawbuck
- Scratch
- Singles
- Smackers
- Soft money – a colloquial term for paper currency in the United States
- Spot – such as "five spot", "ten spot", etc.
- Stacks - large sums of money, 10 racks
- Tenner – £10 note, US$10 bill
- Toonie – Canadian two dollar coin
- Two bits
- Wad
- Wonga – British slang
- Conto – Brazilian Real
- Pau – Brazilian Real
- Pila – Brazilian Real

== See also ==
- Slang terms for money
- List of currencies
- List of historical currencies
