= Journal of Chromatographic Science =

- Discipline: Chromatography
- Language: English
- Edited by: Huba Kalász and Neil Danielson

Publication details
- Former name(s): Journal of Gas Chromatography
- Publisher: Oxford University Press (United Kingdom)
- Impact factor: 1.618 (2020)

Standard abbreviations
- ISO 4: J. Chromatogr. Sci.

Indexing
- CODEN: JCHSBZ
- ISSN: 0021-9665 (print); 1945-239X (web)

Links
- Journal homepage

The Journal of Chromatographic Science (JCS) is a peer reviewed academic journal of chromatography. It is published by Oxford University Press. The Journal focuses on research papers describing practical and preparative applications and analytical methods relevant to a broad range of laboratory work. The editors-in-chief are Huba Kalász and Neil Danielson. According to the Journal Citation Reports, the journal has a 2020 impact factor of 1.618.

== See also ==
- Journal of Analytical Toxicology
- Toxicological Sciences
