= Currency =

Standardization of money

A currency (Note: From Middle English: curraunt, 'in circulation', from Latin: currens, -entis, literally 'running' or 'traversing') is a standardized form of money used as a medium of exchange. Under this definition, the US dollar, the euro, the yen, sterling, (Note: the pound is not the currency, it is its primary unit of account.) and the renminbi (Note: the yuan is not the currency, it is its primary unit of account.) are examples of (government-issued) fiat currencies. Currencies may act as stores of value and be traded between nations in foreign exchange markets, which determine the relative values of the different currencies.

== Early currency ==
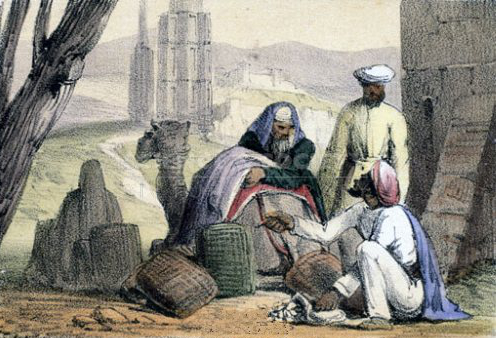
Cowry shells being used as money by an Arab trader

Originally, currency was a form of receipt, representing grain stored in temple granaries in Sumer in ancient Mesopotamia and in Ancient Egypt. In this first stage of currency, metals were used as symbols to represent value stored in the form of commodities.

This formed the basis of trade in the Fertile Crescent for over 1500 years. However, the collapse of the Near Eastern trading system pointed to a flaw: in an era where there was no place that was safe to store value, the value of a circulating medium could only be as sound as the forces that defended that store. A trade could only reach as far as the credibility of that military. By the late Bronze Age, however, a series of treaties had established safe passage for merchants around the Eastern Mediterranean, spreading from Minoan Crete and Mycenae in the northwest to Elam and Bahrain in the southeast. It is not known what was used as a currency for these exchanges, but it is thought that oxhide-shaped ingots of copper, produced in Cyprus, may have functioned as a currency.

It is thought that the increase in piracy and raiding associated with the Bronze Age collapse, possibly produced by the Peoples of the Sea, brought the trading system of oxhide ingots to an end. It was only the recovery of Phoenician trade in the 10th and 9th centuries BC that led to a return to prosperity, and the appearance of real coinage, possibly first in Anatolia with Croesus of Lydia and subsequently with the Greeks and Persians. In Africa, many forms of value store have been used, including beads, ingots, ivory, various forms of weapons, livestock, the manilla currency, shell money, and ochre and other earth oxides. The manilla rings of West Africa were one of the currencies used from the 15th century onwards to sell slaves. African currency is still notable for its variety, and in many places, various forms of barter still apply.

== Coinage ==
The prevalence of metal coins possibly led to the metal itself being the store of value: first copper, then both silver and gold, and at one point also bronze. Today other non-precious metals are used for coins. Metals were mined, weighed, and stamped into coins. This was to assure the individual accepting the coin that they were getting a certain known weight of precious metal. Coins could be counterfeited, but the existence of standard coins also created a new unit of account, which helped lead to banking. Archimedes' principle provided the next link: coins could now be easily tested for their fine weight of the metal, and thus the value of a coin could be determined, even if it had been shaved, debased or otherwise tampered with (see Numismatics).

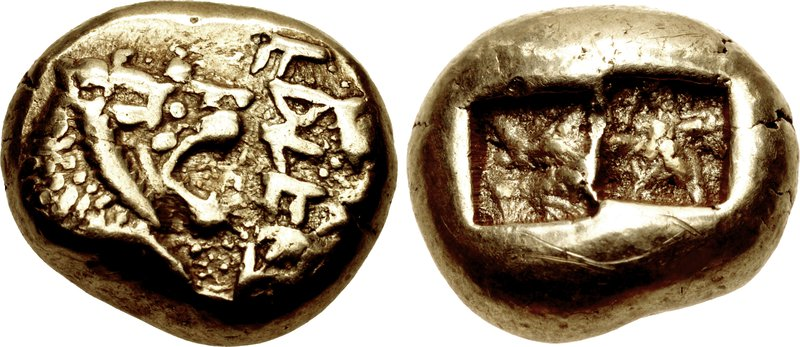
The world's oldest coin, created in the ancient Kingdom of Lydia

Most major economies using coinage had several tiers of coins of different values, made of copper, silver, and gold. Gold coins were the most valuable and were used for large purchases, payment of the military, and backing of state activities. Units of account were often defined as the value of a particular type of gold coin. Silver coins were used for midsized transactions, and sometimes also defined a unit of account, while coins of copper or silver, or some mixture of them (see debasement), might be used for everyday transactions. This system had been used in ancient India since the time of the Mahajanapadas. The exact ratios between the values of the three metals varied greatly between different eras and places; for example, the opening of silver mines in the Harz mountains of central Europe made silver relatively less valuable, as did the flood of New World silver after the Spanish conquests. However, the rarity of gold consistently made it more valuable than silver, and likewise silver was consistently worth more than copper.

== Paper money ==
In premodern China, the need for lending and for a medium of exchange that was less physically cumbersome than large numbers of copper coins led to the introduction of paper money, i.e. banknotes. Their introduction was a gradual process that lasted from the late Tang dynasty (618–907) into the Song dynasty (960–1279). It began as a means for merchants to exchange heavy coinage for receipts of deposit issued as promissory notes by wholesalers' shops. These notes were valid for temporary use in a small regional territory. In the 10th century, the Song dynasty government began to circulate these notes amongst the traders in its monopolized salt industry. The Song government granted several shops the right to issue banknotes, and in the early 12th century the government finally took over these shops to produce state-issued currency. Yet the banknotes issued were still only locally and temporarily valid: it was not until the mid 13th century that a standard and uniform government issue of paper money became an acceptable nationwide currency. The already widespread methods of woodblock printing and then Bi Sheng's movable type printing by the 11th century were the impetus for the mass production of paper money in premodern China.

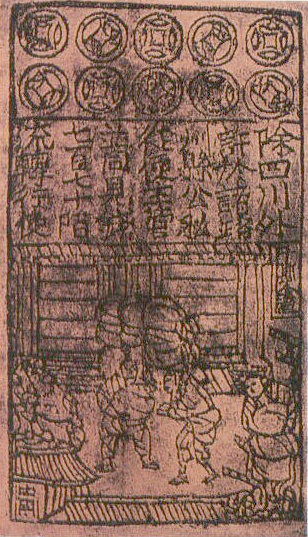
Song dynasty Jiaozi, the world's earliest paper money

At around the same time in the medieval Islamic world, a vigorous monetary economy was created during the 7th–12th centuries on the basis of the expanding levels of circulation of a stable high-value currency (the dinar). Innovations introduced by Muslim economists, traders and merchants include the earliest uses of credit, cheques, promissory notes, savings accounts, transaction accounts, loaning, trusts, exchange rates, the transfer of credit and debt, and banking institutions for loans and deposits.

In Europe, paper currency was first introduced on a regular basis in Sweden in 1661 (although Washington Irving records an earlier emergency use of it, by the Spanish in a siege during the Conquest of Granada). As Sweden was rich in copper, many copper coins were in circulation, but its relatively low value necessitated extraordinarily big coins, often weighing several kilograms.

The advantages of paper currency were numerous: it reduced the need to transport gold and silver, which was risky; it facilitated loans of gold or silver at interest, since the underlying specie (money in the form of gold or silver coins rather than notes) never left the possession of the lender until someone else redeemed the note; and it allowed a division of currency into credit- and specie-backed forms. It enabled the sale of investment in joint-stock companies and the redemption of those shares in a paper.

But there were also disadvantages. First, since a note has no intrinsic value, there was nothing to stop issuing authorities from printing more notes than they had specie to back them with. Second, because this increased the money supply, it increased inflationary pressures, a fact observed by David Hume in the 18th century. Thus paper money would often lead to an inflationary bubble, which could collapse if people began demanding hard money, causing the demand for paper notes to fall to zero. The printing of paper money was also associated with wars, and financing of wars, and therefore regarded as part of maintaining a standing army. For these reasons, paper currency was held in suspicion and hostility in Europe and America. It was also addictive since the speculative profits of trade and capital creation were quite large. Major nations established mints to print money and mint coins, and branches of their treasury to collect taxes and hold gold and silver stock.

At that time, both silver and gold were considered a legal tender and accepted by governments for taxes. However, the instability in the exchange rate between the two grew over the course of the 19th century, with the increases both in the supply of these metals, particularly silver, and in trade. The parallel use of both metals is called bimetallism, and the attempt to create a bimetallic standard where both gold and silver backed currency remained in circulation occupied the efforts of inflationists. Governments at this point could use currency as an instrument of policy, printing paper currency such as the United States greenback, to pay for military expenditures. They could also set the terms at which they would redeem notes for specie, by limiting the amount of purchase, or the minimum amount that could be redeemed.

By 1900, most of the industrializing nations were on some form of gold standard, with paper notes and silver coins constituting the circulating medium. Private banks and governments across the world followed Gresham's law: keeping the gold and silver they received but paying out in notes. This did not happen all around the world at the same time, but occurred sporadically, generally in times of war or financial crisis, beginning in the early 20th century and continuing across the world until the late 20th century, when the regime of floating fiat currencies came into force. One of the last countries to break away from the gold standard was the United States in 1971, an action which was known as the Nixon shock. No country has an enforceable gold standard or silver standard currency system.

== Banknote era ==
A banknote or a bill is a type of currency token and it is commonly used as legal tender in many jurisdictions. Together with coins, banknotes make up the cash form of a currency. Banknotes were initially mostly paper, but Australia's Commonwealth Scientific and Industrial Research Organisation developed a polymer currency in the 1980s; it went into circulation on the nation's bicentenary in 1988. Polymer banknotes had already been introduced in the Isle of Man in 1983. As of 2016, polymer currency is used in over 20 countries (over 40 if counting commemorative issues), and dramatically increases the life span of banknotes and reduces counterfeiting.

== Modern currencies ==
The currency used is based on the concept of lex monetae; that a sovereign state decides which currency it shall use. (See Fiat currency.)

== Currency codes and currency symbols ==
In 1978 the International Organization for Standardization published a system of three-digit alphabetic codes (ISO 4217) to denote currencies. These codes are based on two initial letters allocated to a specific country and a final letter denoting a specific monetary unit of account.

Many currencies use a currency symbol. These are not subject to international standards and are not unique: the dollar sign in particular has many uses.

== List of major world payment currencies ==
The following table are SWIFT's estimates of the 20 most frequently used currencies in world payments in August 2026.

20 major currencies in world payments (August 2026)
Rank	ISO 4217	Currency	% of world total
	World		100.00%
1	USD	United States dollar	49.63%
2	EUR	(European Union) Euro	21.69%
3	GBP	(United Kingdom) Pound sterling	6.89%
4	JPY	(Japan) Japanese yen	3.40%
5	CNY	(China) Renminbi (yuan)	3.33%
6	CAD	(Canada) Canadian dollar	2.71%
7	HKD	Hong Kong dollar	1.91%
8	AUD	(Australia) Australian dollar	1.74%
9	SGD	Singapore dollar	1.31%
10	CHF	(Switzerland) Swiss franc	0.92%
11	THB	(Thailand) Thai baht	0.83%
12	SEK	(Sweden) Swedish krona	0.72%
13	PLN	(Poland) Polish złoty	0.71%
14	NOK	(Norway) Norwegian krone	0.57%
15	NZD	New Zealand dollar	0.33%
16	MXN	(Mexico) Mexican peso	0.31%
17	DKK	(Denmark) Danish krone	0.31%
18	ZAR	(South Africa) South African rand	0.28%
19	HUF	(Hungary) Hungarian forint	0.24%
20	MYR	(Malaysia) Malaysian ringgit	0.22%

== Control and production ==
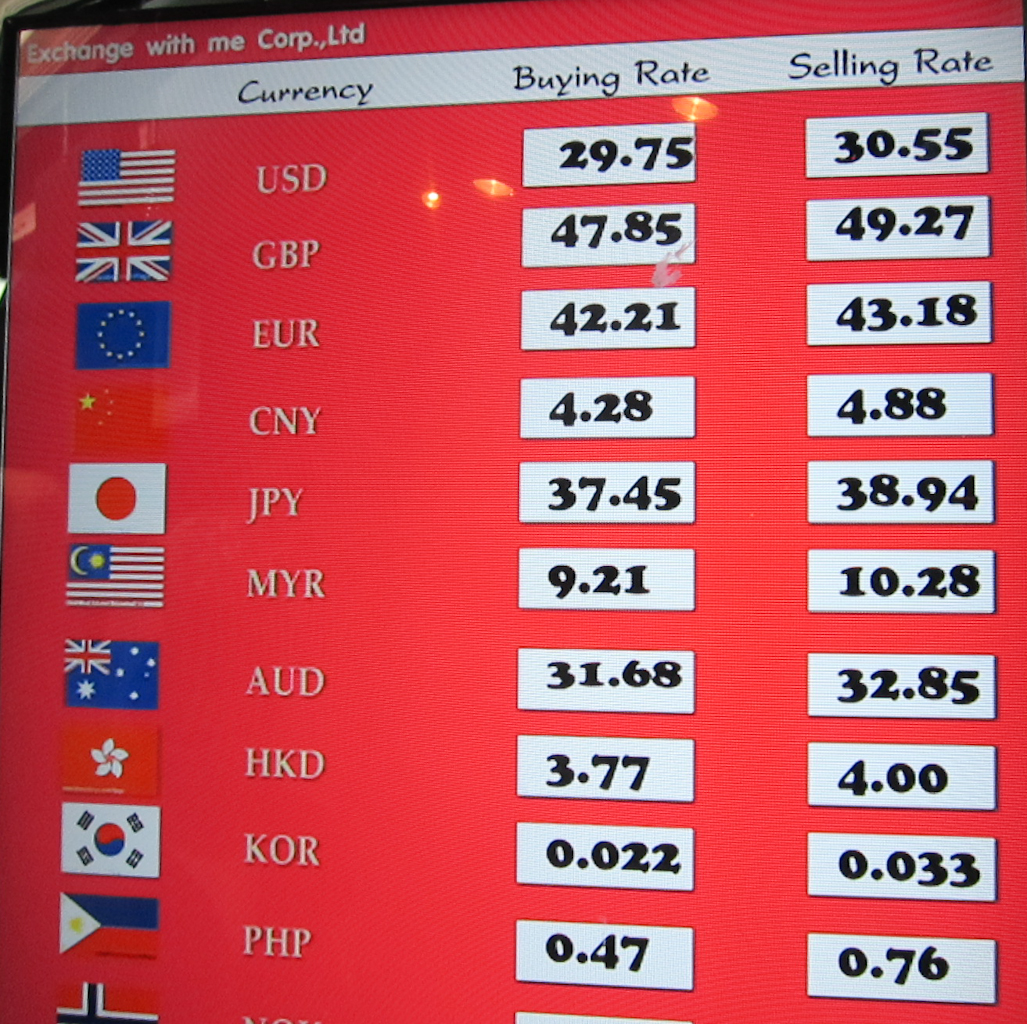
A list of exchange rates for various base currencies given by a money changer in Thailand, with the Thai baht as the counter (or quote) currency.

Most traded currencies by value Currency distribution of global foreign exchange market turnover
Currency	ISO 4217 code	Proportion of daily volume		Change (2022–2025)
Currency	ISO 4217 code	April 2022	April 2025	Change (2022–2025)
United States dollar	USD	88.4%	89.2%	▲0.8pp
Euro	EUR	30.6%	28.9%	▼1.7pp
Japanese yen	JPY	16.7%	16.8%	▲0.1pp
Pound sterling	GBP	12.9%	10.2%	▼2.7pp
Renminbi	CNY	7.0%	8.5%	▲1.5pp
Swiss franc	CHF	5.2%	6.4%	▲1.2pp
Australian dollar	AUD	6.4%	6.1%	▼0.3pp
Canadian dollar	CAD	6.2%	5.8%	▼0.4pp
Hong Kong dollar	HKD	2.6%	3.8%	▲1.2pp
Singapore dollar	SGD	2.4%	2.4%	Steady
Indian rupee	INR	1.6%	1.9%	▲0.3pp
South Korean won	KRW	1.8%	1.8%	Steady
Swedish krona	SEK	2.2%	1.6%	▼0.6pp
Mexican peso	MXN	1.5%	1.6%	▲0.1pp
New Zealand dollar	NZD	1.7%	1.5%	▼0.2pp
Norwegian krone	NOK	1.7%	1.3%	▼0.4pp
New Taiwan dollar	TWD	1.1%	1.2%	▲0.1pp
Brazilian real	BRL	0.9%	0.9%	Steady
South African rand	ZAR	1.0%	0.8%	▼0.2pp
Polish złoty	PLN	0.7%	0.8%	▲0.1pp
Danish krone	DKK	0.7%	0.7%	Steady
Indonesian rupiah	IDR	0.4%	0.7%	▲0.3pp
Turkish lira	TRY	0.4%	0.5%	▲0.1pp
Thai baht	THB	0.4%	0.5%	▲0.1pp
Israeli new shekel	ILS	0.4%	0.4%	Steady
Hungarian forint	HUF	0.3%	0.4%	▲0.1pp
Czech koruna	CZK	0.4%	0.4%	Steady
Chilean peso	CLP	0.3%	0.3%	Steady
Philippine peso	PHP	0.2%	0.2%	Steady
Colombian peso	COP	0.2%	0.2%	Steady
Malaysian ringgit	MYR	0.2%	0.2%	Steady
UAE dirham	AED	0.4%	0.1%	▼0.3pp
Saudi riyal	SAR	0.2%	0.1%	▼0.1pp
Romanian leu	RON	0.1%	0.1%	Steady
Peruvian sol	PEN	0.1%	0.1%	Steady
Other currencies		2.6%	3.4%	▲0.8pp
Total (Note: The total sum is 200% because each currency trade is counted twice: once for the currency being bought and once for the currency being sold. The percentages above represent the proportion of all trades involving a given currency, regardless of which side of the transaction it is on.)		200.0%	200.0%	

Commonly a central bank has the exclusive power to issue all forms of currency, including coins and banknotes (fiat money), and to restrain the circulation alternative currencies for its own area of circulation (a country or group of countries); it regulates the production of currency by banks (credit) through monetary policy.

An exchange rate is a price at which two currencies can be exchanged against each other. This is used for trade between the two currency zones. Exchange rates can be classified as either floating or fixed. In the former, day-to-day movements in exchange rates are determined by the market; in the latter, governments intervene in the market to buy or sell their currency to balance supply and demand at a static exchange rate.

In cases where a country has control of its own currency, that control is exercised either by a central bank or by a Ministry of Finance. The institution that has control of monetary policy is referred to as the monetary authority. Monetary authorities have varying degrees of autonomy from the governments that create them. A monetary authority is created and supported by its sponsoring government, so independence can be reduced by the legislative or executive authority that creates it.

Several countries can use the same name for their own separate currencies (for example, a dollar in Australia, Canada, and the United States). By contrast, several countries can also use the same currency (for example, the euro or the CFA franc), or one country can declare the currency of another country to be legal tender. For example, Panama and El Salvador have declared US currency to be legal tender, and from 1791 to 1857, Spanish dollars were legal tender in the United States. At various times countries have either re-stamped foreign coins or used currency boards, issuing one note of currency for each note of a foreign government held, as Ecuador currently does.

Each currency typically has a main currency unit (the dollar, for example, or the euro) and a fractional unit, often defined as 1/100 of the main unit: 100 cents = 1 dollar, 100 centimes = 1 franc, 100 pence = 1 pound, although units of 1/10 or 1/1000 occasionally also occur. Some currencies do not have any smaller units at all, such as the Icelandic króna and the Japanese yen.

Mauritania and Madagascar are the only remaining countries that have theoretical fractional units not based on the decimal system; instead, the Mauritanian ouguiya is in theory divided into 5 khoums, while the Malagasy ariary is theoretically divided into 5 iraimbilanja. In these countries, words like dollar or pound "were simply names for given weights of gold". Due to inflation khoums and iraimbilanja have in practice fallen into disuse. (See non-decimal currencies for other historic currencies with non-decimal divisions.)

== Currency convertibility ==
Subject to variation around the world, local currency can be converted to another currency or vice versa with or without central bank/government intervention. Such conversions take place in the foreign exchange market. Based on the above restrictions or free and readily conversion features, currencies are classified as:

Fully convertible
When there are no restrictions or limitations on the amount of currency that can be traded on the international market, and the government does not artificially impose a fixed value or minimum value on the currency in international trade. The US dollar is one of the main fully convertible currencies.
Partially convertible
Central banks control international investments flowing into and out of a country. While most domestic transactions are handled without any special requirements, there are significant restrictions on international investing, and special approval is often required in order to convert into other currencies. The Indian rupee and the renminbi are examples of partially convertible currencies.
Nonconvertible
A government neither participates in the international currency market nor allows the conversion of its currency by individuals or companies. These currencies are also known as blocked, e.g. the North Korean won and the Cuban peso.

According to the three aspects of trade in goods and services, capital flows and national policies, the supply-demand relationship of different currencies determines the exchange ratio between currencies.

Trade in goods and services

Through cost transfer, goods and services circulating in the country (such as hotels, tourism, catering, advertising, household services) will indirectly affect the trade cost of goods and services and the price of export trade. Therefore, services and goods involved in international trade are not the only reason affecting the exchange rate. The large number of international tourists and overseas students has resulted in the flow of services and goods at home and abroad. It also represents that the competitiveness of global goods and services directly affects the change of international exchange rates.

Capital flows

National currencies will be traded on international markets for investment purposes. Investment opportunities in each country attract other countries into investment programs, so that these foreign currencies become the reserves of the central banks of each country. The exchange rate mechanism, in which currencies are quoted continuously between countries, is based on foreign exchange markets in which currencies are invested by individuals and traded or speculated by central banks and investment institutions. In addition, changes in interest rates, capital market fluctuations and changes in investment opportunities will affect the global capital inflows and outflows of countries around the world, and exchange rates will fluctuate accordingly.

National policies

The country's foreign trade, monetary and fiscal policies affect the exchange rate fluctuations. Foreign trade includes policies such as tariffs and import standards for commodity exports. The impact of monetary policy on the total amount and yield of money directly determines the changes in the international exchange rate. Fiscal policies, such as transfer payments, taxation ratios, and other factors, dominate the profitability of capital and economic development, and the ratio of national debt issuance to deficit determines the repayment capacity and credit rating of the country. Such policies determine the mechanism of linking domestic and foreign currencies and therefore have a significant impact on the generation of exchange rates.

Currency convertibility is closely linked to economic development and finance. There are strict conditions for countries to achieve currency convertibility, which is a good way for countries to improve their economies. The currencies of some countries or regions in the world are freely convertible, such as the US dollar, Australian dollar and Japanese yen. The requirements for currency convertibility can be roughly divided into four parts:

Sound microeconomic agency

With a freely convertible currency, domestic firms will have to compete fiercely with their foreign counterparts. The development of competition among them will affect the implementation effect of currency convertibility. In addition, microeconomics is a prerequisite for macroeconomic conditions.

The macroeconomic situation and policies are stable

Since currency convertibility is the cross-border flow of goods and capital, it will have an impact on the macro economy. This requires that the national economy be in a normal and orderly state, that is, there is no serious inflation and economic overheating. In addition, the government should use macro policies to make mature adjustments to deal with the impact of currency exchange on the economy.

A reasonable and open economy

The maintainability of international balance of payments is the main performance of reasonable economic structure. Currency convertibility not only causes difficulties in the sustainability of international balance of payments but also affects the government's direct control over international economic transactions. To eliminate the foreign exchange shortage, the government needs adequate international reserves.

Appropriate exchange rate regime and level

The level of exchange rate is an important factor in maintaining exchange rate stability, both before and after currency convertibility. The exchange rate of freely convertible currency is too high or too low, which can easily trigger speculation and undermine the stability of macroeconomic and financial markets. Therefore, to maintain the level of exchange rate, a proper exchange rate regime is crucial.

== Alternative currencies ==
The concept of a digital currency has arisen in recent years. Whether government-backed digital notes and coins (such as the digital renminbi in China, for example) will be successfully developed and implemented remains unknown. Digital currencies that are not issued by a government monetary authority, such as cryptocurrencies like Bitcoin, are different because their value is market-dependent and has no safety net. Various countries have expressed concern about the opportunities that cryptocurrencies create for illegal activities such as scams, ransomware (extortion), money laundering and terrorism. In 2014, the United States IRS advised that virtual currency is treated as property for federal income-tax purposes, and it provides examples of how long-standing tax principles applicable to transactions involving property apply to virtual currency.

Distinct from centrally controlled government-issued currencies, there are private decentralized trust-reduced networks that support alternative trading instruments which they describe as currencies and that are classified as cryptocurrency. With few exceptions, these instruments are not asset backed. In 2019, the U.S. Commodity Futures Trading Commission declared Bitcoin (and, by extension, similar products) to be a commodity under the Commodity Exchange Act. Historically, pseudo-currencies have also included company scrip, a form of wages that could only be exchanged in company stores owned by the employers. Modern token money, such as the tokens operated by local exchange trading systems (LETS), is a form of barter rather than being a true currency. The pseudo-currency may be Internet-based and digital: for instance, most cryptocurrencies are not tied to any specific country. Possession and sale of alternative forms of currencies is often outlawed by governments in order to preserve the legitimacy of the constitutional currency for the benefit of all citizens. For example, Article I, section 8, clause 5 of the United States Constitution delegates to Congress the power to coin money and to regulate the value thereof. This power was delegated to Congress in order to establish and preserve a uniform standard of value and to insure a singular monetary system for all purchases and debts in the United States, public and private. Along with the power to coin money, the United States Congress has the concurrent power to restrain the circulation of money which is not issued under its own authority in order to protect and preserve the constitutional currency. It is a violation of federal law for individuals, or organizations to create private coin or currency systems to compete with the official coinage and currency of the United States.

== Local currency ==
In economics, a local currency is a currency not backed by a national government and intended to trade only in a small area. Advocates such as Jane Jacobs argue that this enables an economically depressed region to pull itself up, by giving the people living there a medium of exchange that they can use to exchange services and locally produced goods (in a broader sense, this is the original purpose of all money). Opponents of this concept argue that local currency creates a barrier that can interfere with economies of scale and comparative advantage and that in some cases they can serve as a means of tax evasion.

Local currencies can also come into being when there is economic turmoil involving the national currency. An example of this is the Argentinian economic crisis of 2002 in which IOUs issued by local governments quickly took on some of the characteristics of local currencies.

One of the best examples of a local currency is the original LETS currency, founded on Vancouver Island in the early 1980s. In 1982, the Canadian Central Bank's lending rates ran up to 14% which drove chartered bank lending rates as high as 19%. The resulting currency and credit scarcity left island residents with few options other than to create a local currency.

== See also ==
Related concepts

- Counterfeit money – Imitation currency intended to defraud
- Currency band – Range of values for the exchange rate
- Currency symbol – Symbol used to represent a monetary currency's name
- Currency transaction tax – Tax on the use of currency
- Debasement – Practice of lowering the intrinsic value of coins
- Exchange rate – Rate at which one currency will be exchanged for another
- Fiscal localism – Institutions of localized monetary exchange
- Foreign currency exchange – Business where a currency can be exchanged for another
- Foreign exchange reserves – Money held by a central bank to pay debts, if needed
- Functional currency – Primary accounting unit in a business
- History of banking
- History of money
- Mutilated currency – Physical damage to notes and coins
- Optimum currency area – Geographical region which efficiently shares a single currency
- Slang terms for money – List of international slang
- Demurrage currency – Money designed to lose purchasing power
- Virtual currency – Unregulated means of exchange within a user group
- World currency – Currency that is widely used internationally

Accounting units

- Currency pair – Quotation of the relative value of two currencies
- Currency symbol – Symbol used to represent a monetary currency's name
- Currency strength – Foreign exchange trading indicator
- European Currency Unit – Obsolete unit of account of the European Community
- Fictional currency – Media of exchange found in narratives with imaginative elements
- Franc Poincaré – Historic unit of account for international settlements
- Local currencies – One exchangeable between paricipants in a limited area
- Petrocurrency – Financial asset backed by a country's revenues from petroleum exports
- Special drawing rights – Supplementary foreign exchange reserve assets defined and maintained by the IMF

Lists

- ISO 4217 – Standard defining codes for currencies
- List of alternative names for currency
- List of currencies
- List of circulating currencies
- List of proposed currencies
- List of historical currencies
- List of international trade topics
- List of motifs on banknotes
