= National Drug Evidence Centre =

English research centre

NDEC logo

The National Drug Evidence Centre (NDEC) is part of the University of Manchester Faculty of Medical and Human Sciences, located on Oxford Road in Manchester, United Kingdom.

== Overview ==
NDEC carries out epidemiological, evaluative and policy-related research in the field of substance misuse, working within the Health Service and Criminal justice systems at local, national and European levels. NDEC has strong collaborative links with the European Monitoring Centre on Drugs and Drug Addiction in Lisbon, IFT Germany and IVV Holland. In the UK, the work of the centre is intrinsically linked to the Department of Health, Home Office and National Treatment Agency (NTA).

NDEC is responsible for analyses and reporting of national government statistics on drug/alcohol misuse treatment, delivered through a National Statistics hub, and is developing a National Data Library for use by policy makers, clinical services and researchers.

The Visualisation Group within NDEC developed ViewIt, a web visualisation tool with content management and data extraction functions that allow the investigation and contextualisation of any dataset in tabular, graphical and map-based formats.

== History ==
NDEC began in the Victoria University of Manchester in 1987. Formerly called Drug Misuse Research Unit, it "has developed into an academic research and information centre concerned with understanding the extent and nature of drug/ alcohol problems in communities in the context of public health, alongside evaluation of risk prevention and intervention responses, and has been responsible for the introduction and development of information systems now in use across the whole of the UK and Europe," according to its official website.

== Recent or current high profile research grants and projects ==
- "Evaluation of PbR Drugs Recovery Pilots", Department of Health Policy Research Programme, 2011–2014
- "Epidemiology of Drug Misuse", National Treatment Agency, 2003–2013
- "Treatment Demand Indicator", European Monitoring Centre on Drugs & Drug Addiction, 2005–2013
- "Incidence, prevalence, harms and interventions effects for problem and injecting drug use": crime, morbidity & mortality, Medical Research Council, 2010–2013
- "Drug Treatment Outcomes Research Study (DTORS)", Home Office, 2005–2007
- "Diversion and aftercare programmes for offenders using class A drugs" – a systematic review and economic model, NHS, National Institute for Health Research, 2010–2012
- "Creating a Drug Data Warehouse (DDW)", Home Office, 2009–2011
- "Time Trends in Adolescent drug & alcohol misuse", Nuffield Foundation, 2006–2008
