= Lex monetae =

In which a sovereign decides its own currency

Lex monetae is a Latin phrase which means that a sovereign state chooses which currency it will use and that the meaning of units of above-mentioned currency is determined by the law of the country whose money is in question.

The concept has been identified as a potential problem if the Eurozone breaks up or a member state decides to leave it, since debts in euros may turn into debts owed in another currency. Conversion would be at a rate determined by the nation in question, and no party to a contract or transaction will have the right to default on it.
