= Bit (money) =

Former currency unit

The word bit is a colloquial expression referring to specific coins in various coinages throughout the world. For example the United States refers to 2 bits as a quarter, that would be 12.5 cents USD.

== United States ==
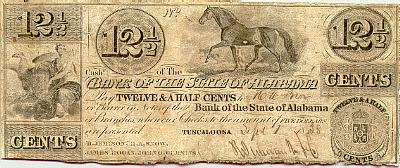
Banknote for "Twelve and a Half Cents" = $1/8, Alabama, 1838

In the US, the bit is equal to 12 1/2¢, a designation that dates from the colonial period, when the most common unit of currency used was the Spanish dollar, also known as "piece of eight", which was worth 8 Spanish silver reales. $1/8 or 1 silver real was 1 "bit".

With the adoption of the decimal U.S. currency in 1794, there was no longer a U.S. coin worth $1/8, but "two bits" remained in the language with the meaning of $1/4. Because there was no 1-bit coin, a dime (10¢) was sometimes called a short bit and 15¢ a long bit. (The picayune, which was originally 1/2 real or 1/2 bit (6 1/4¢), was similarly transferred to the US nickel.)

In addition, Spanish coinage, like other foreign coins, continued to be widely used and allowed as legal tender by Chapter XXII of the Act of April 10, 1806 until the Coinage Act of 1857 discontinued the practice.

Robert Louis Stevenson describes his experience with bits in Across the Plains, (1892) p. 144:

In the Pacific States they have made a bolder push for complexity, and settle their affairs by a coin that no longer exists – the bit, or old Mexican real. The supposed value of the bit is twelve and a half cents, eight to the dollar. When it comes to two bits, the quarter-dollar stands for the required amount. But how about an odd bit? The nearest coin to it is a dime, which is, short by a fifth. That, then, is called a short bit. If you have one, you lay it triumphantly down, and save two and a half cents. But if you have not, and lay down a quarter, the bar-keeper or shopman calmly tenders you a dime by way of change; and thus you have paid what is called a long bit, and lost two and a half cents, or even, by comparison with a short bit, five cents.

"Two bits" or "two bit" continues in general use as a colloquial expression, for 25¢, or a quarter dollar as in song and catchphrase "Shave and a Haircut, two bits." As an adjective, "two-bit" describes something cheap or unworthy.

Roger Miller's song "King of the Road" features the lines: Ah, but two hours of pushin' broom buys an / Eight by twelve four-bit room referring to signs stating "Rooms to let, 50¢."

In the early 1930s, Crown Records was a US record label that sold records for only 25¢. The company advertised on their sleeves, "2 Hits for 2 Bits."

Another example of this use of "bit" can be found in the poem "Six-Bits Blues" by Langston Hughes, which includes the following couplet: Gimme six bits' worth o'ticket / On a train that runs somewhere.…

The expression also survives in the sports cheer "Two bits, four bits, six bits, a dollar … all for (player's name), stand up and holler!"

The New York Stock Exchange continued to list stock prices in $1/8 until June 24, 1997, at which time it started listing in $1/16. It did not fully implement decimal listing until January 29, 2001.

== Danish West Indies ==
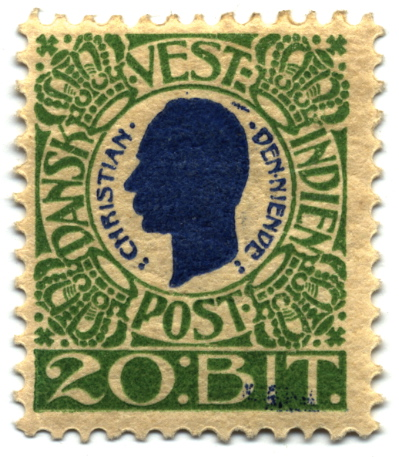
A 20-bit postage stamp of the Danish West Indies, 1905

From 1905 to 1917, the Danish West Indies used the bit as part of its currency system. In 1904, two new currency denominations were introduced: the bit and francs which were overlaid on the old cent and daler denominations. The four units were related as 5 bits = 1 cent, 100 bits = 20 cents = 1 franc, 100 cents = 5 francs = 1 daler. Coins were issued each denominated in two units, bits and cents, francs and cents, or francs and daler. Postage stamps were denominated in bits and francs; the lowest value was five bits.

== United Kingdom, Commonwealth countries and Ireland ==
In Britain, Ireland and parts of the former British Empire, where before decimalisation a British-style currency of "pounds, shillings and pence" was in use, the word "bit" was applied colloquially to any of a range of low-denomination coins. Thus a threepence coin or "threepenny piece" was referred to as a "threepenny bit", usually pronounced "thrupny bit".

The term was used only for coins with a value of several named units (e.g., three pence), and never applied to a penny, shilling, or half crown coin.

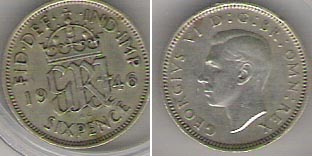
A 1946 "sixpenny bit" of George VI

Although earlier there had been other values in circulation such as the "fourpenny bit" or "groat", the "bit" coins still in use in the United Kingdom up to decimalisation in 1971 were the two-shilling bit (or "florin") (often "two-bob bit"), the sixpenny bit (or "tanner"), and the threepenny bit.

In the UK, use of the term "bit" had already disappeared with the exception of the 'thruppeny bit', by the time British currency moved to decimal coinage and the consequential loss of the coin denominations to which it had applied. Thus a ten pence piece is referred to merely as "ten pence", or even "ten pee", not as a "tenpenny bit". The term 'pee' refers to the change in abbreviation of the British penny from 'd' to 'p' which denoted the 'New Penny'.

The historic American adjective "two-bit" (to describe something worthless or insignificant) has a British equivalent in "tuppenny-ha'penny" – literally, worth two and a half (old) pence.

== See also ==
- Picayune
- Spanish real
- Spanish dollar (also known as "piece of eight")
- Danish West Indian daler
- List of alternative names for currency
