= Contaminated currency =

Paper currency with drug or disease residues

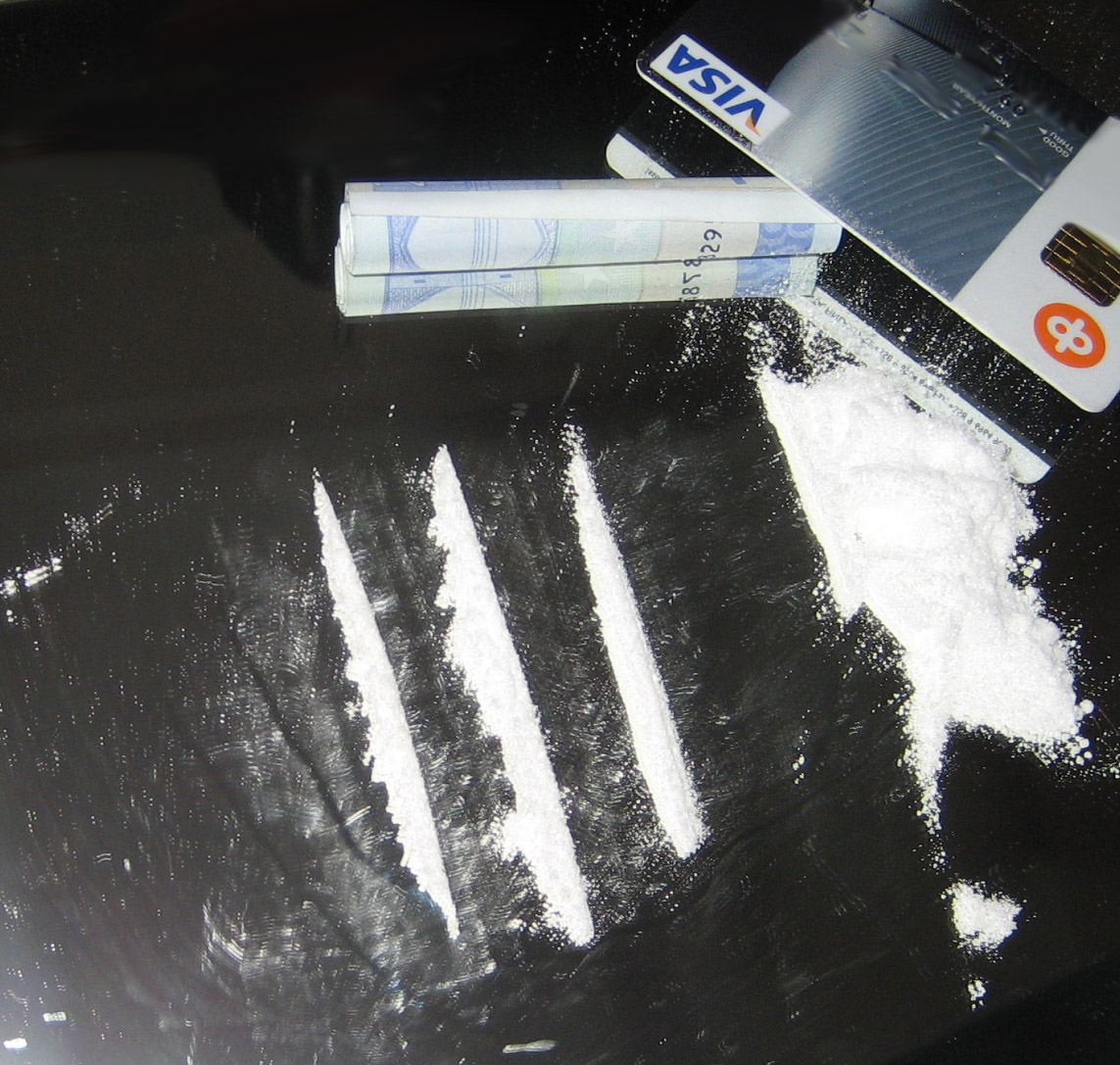
Lines of cocaine prepared for snorting through a rolled 20 euro note. Contaminated currency such as banknotes might serve as a fomite.

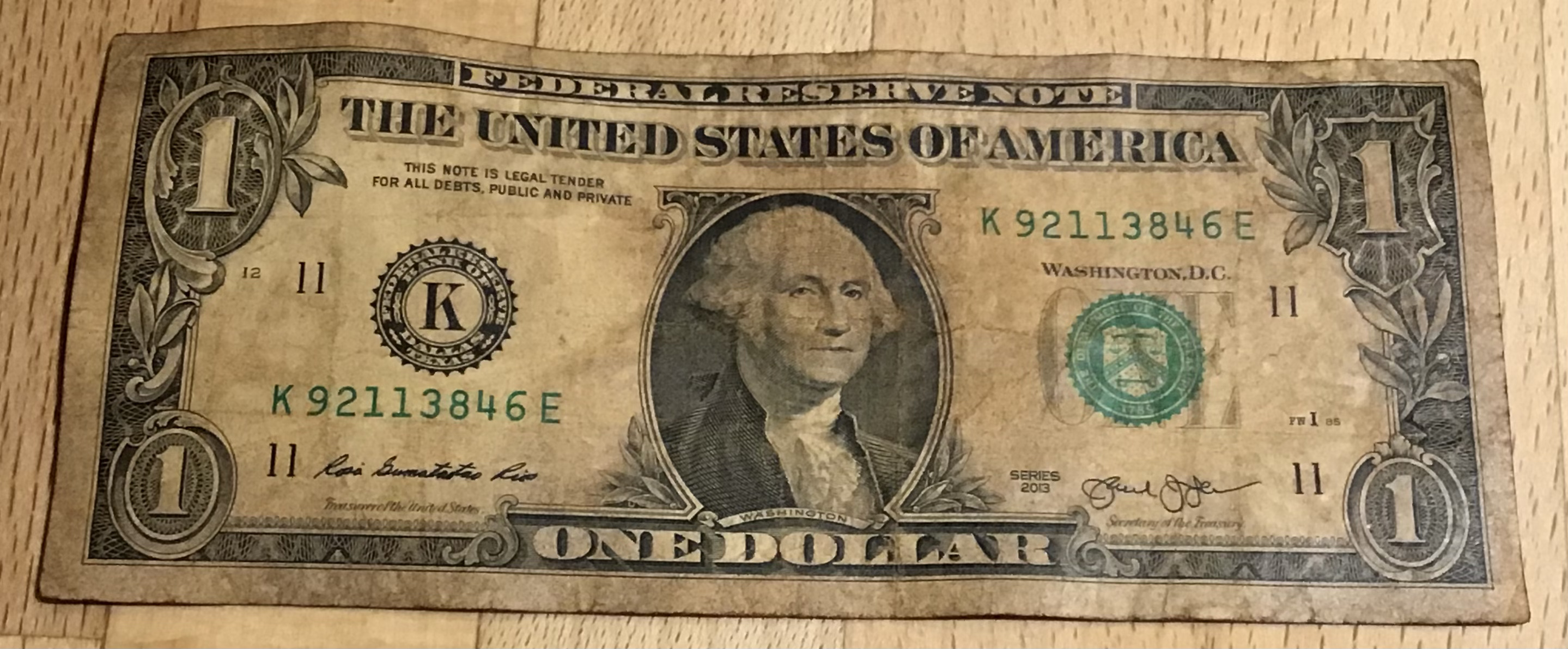
A $1 bill that has been stained as a result of black coffee being spilled on it. Due to the absorbency of the materials that make up dollar bills, they can be stained and contaminated by substances in the environment.

Most banknotes have traces of cocaine on them; this has been confirmed by studies done in several countries. In 1994, the U.S. 9th Circuit Court of Appeals cited findings that in Los Angeles, three out of four banknotes were tainted by cocaine or another illicit drug.

Studies indicate that banknotes may serve as a fomite—an inanimate object that can spread disease if contaminated—though researchers disagree over how easily diseases are transmitted by this mechanism.

Several theories have been suggested to explain this contamination beyond the predictable contamination due to handling during drug deals and the use of rolled up notes for snorting drugs. After the initial contamination, the substance is transferred to other notes in close contact, often stacked together, in enclosed environments common in financial institutions.

== In the United States ==
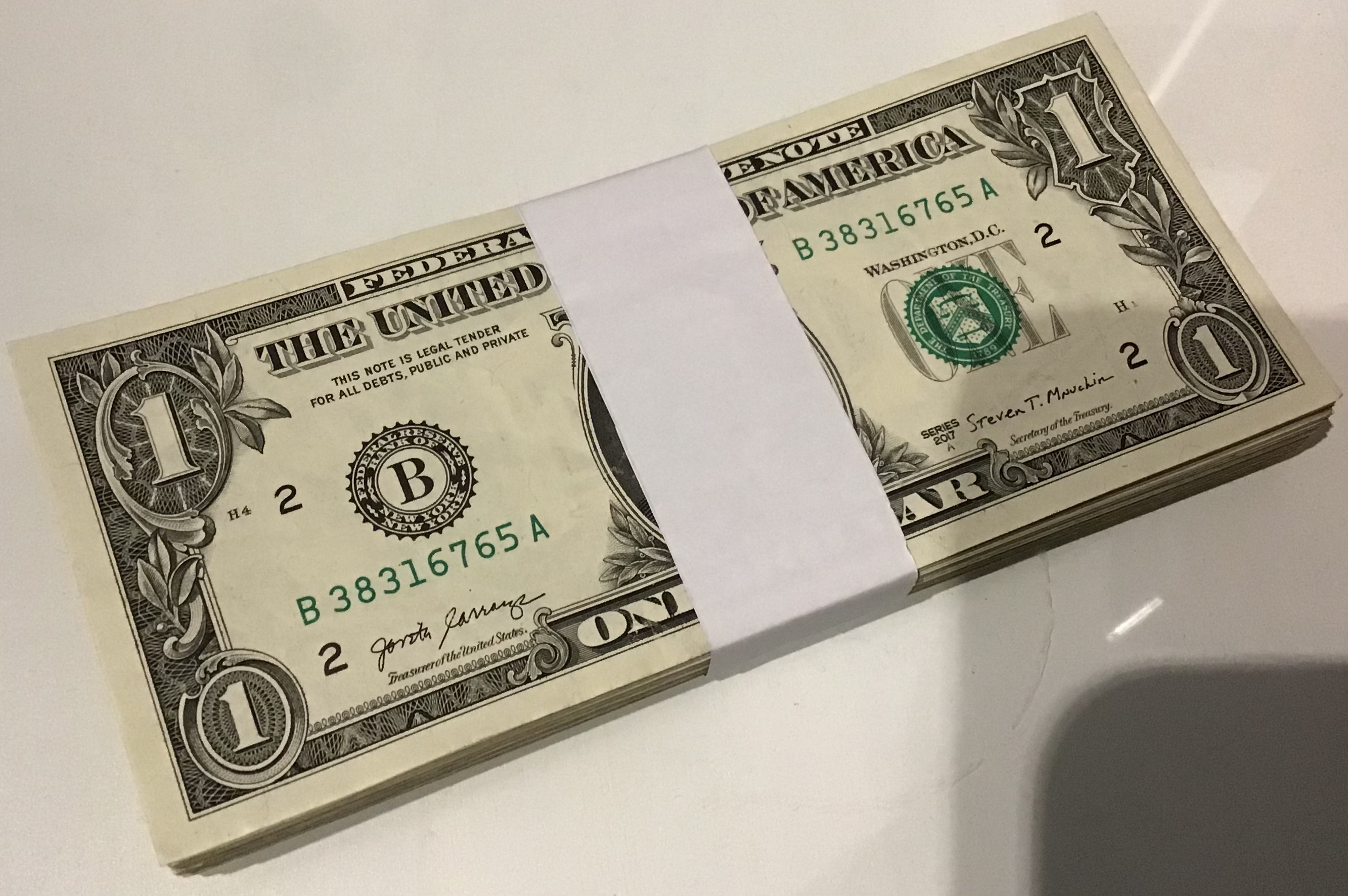
A stack of 80 circulated $1 bills, held together with a currency strap made from paper. Due to the way banknotes are stored, contaminants on contaminated currency may spread over time.

In a study reported in Forensic Science International, A.J. Jenkins, at the Office of the Cuyahoga County Coroner (Cleveland, OH), the author reports the analysis of ten randomly collected one-dollar bills from five cities, and tested for cocaine, heroin, 6-acetylmorphine (also called "6-AM"), morphine, codeine, methamphetamine, amphetamine and phencyclidine (PCP). Bills were then immersed in acetonitrile for two hours prior to extraction and subjected to Gas chromatography-mass spectrometry (GC-MS) analysis. Results demonstrated that "92% of the bills were positive for cocaine with a mean amount of 28.75 ± 139.07 micrograms per bill, a median of 1.37 μg per bill, and a range of 0.01-922.72 μg per bill. Heroin was detected in seven bills in amounts ranging from 0.03 to 168.5 μg per bill: 6-AM and morphine were detected in three bills; methamphetamine and amphetamine in three and one bills, respectively, and PCP was detected in two bills in amounts of 0.78 and 1.87 μg per bill. Codeine was not detected in any of the one-dollar bills analyzed". The study confirmed that although paper currency was most often contaminated with cocaine, other drugs of abuse may also be detected in bills.

Another study, conducted at Argonne National Laboratory, found that four out of five dollar bills in Chicago suburbs contain traces of cocaine. Previous studies have found similar contamination rates in other cities. The Argonne study is the first to demonstrate that if you handle contaminated bills, cocaine will not be transferred to your hands. "It's virtually impossible for cocaine to rub off", Argonne chemist Jack Demirgian said. This estimate of contamination could be as high as 94%, according to Bill and Rich Sones of the Chicago Sun-Times.

This was confirmed by Ronald K. Siegel in his book, Intoxication: Life in Pursuit of Artificial Paradise, who noted the figure as well. Another study by the Journal of Analytical Toxicology is more conservative, noting a still substantial contamination of 80% of US currency by cocaine.

According to the Journal of Analytical Toxicology, the initial source of the contamination likely comes from money used in the Illegal drug trade in circulation, and the U.S. Federal Reserve unwittingly spreading the substance to clean currency by mixing notes together via counting machines, in addition to simple proximity.

The discovery that cocaine is so prevalent in U.S. banknotes has a legal application that reactions by drug-sniffing dogs is not immediately cause for arrest of persons or confiscation of banknotes. The drug content is generally too low for prosecution but high enough to trigger response to drug-sniffing dogs. This has been contested legally in a number of U.S. states as a standard of what constitutes 'unusual' levels of contamination remains to be achieved (see below).

In addition to traces of illicit drugs, a recent study of currency within New York City have shown that various bacterial species of the human skin and oral flora are also transferred onto paper bank notes, including Cutibacterium acnes, Staphylococcus epidermidis and Micrococcus luteus. Other microbes were found that, while not commonly found as commensals among humans, are still associated with human activities. These included Lactococcus lactis and Streptococcus thermophilus, two species of bacteria typically associated with dairy production and fermentation. The study went on to prove that viable microbes could be isolated and cultured from paper currency. An earlier study conducted in western Ohio obtained similar findings, in which "One-dollar bills were collected from the general community in western Ohio to survey for bacterial contamination. Pathogenic or potentially pathogenic organisms were isolated from 94% of the bills. These results suggest a high rate of bacterial contamination of one-dollar bills."

== In the United Kingdom ==
Forensic scientists have said that around 80% of all British banknotes contain traces of drugs. A 1999 study found even higher levels of contamination in the London area; of 500 notes tested, only four had no traces of cocaine. Most of the banknotes showed only low levels of contamination, suggesting they had merely been in contact with contaminated notes, but 4% of the notes in the study showed higher levels, which the researchers suggested was the result of either being handled by people under the influence of cocaine (which is excreted in skin oils), or by being used directly to snort the drug.

There are drug levels above which banknotes need to be taken out of circulation, and over £15 million worth of notes are destroyed annually for this reason. The destruction is more often done as a precaution than because the money poses a serious health hazard.

Cocaine is the drug most commonly found on banknotes. Heroin and ecstasy are found less often, though the frequency of ecstasy contamination rose in the years leading up to 2002. Joe Reevy of Mass Spec Analytical, a company which analyses confiscated banknotes for the police, pointed out that heroin and ecstasy degrade more rapidly than cocaine, and that a single note which had been used to snort cocaine could subsequently contaminate many others when placed in a sorting machine, to explain the frequency of cocaine contamination.

Money recovered from police raids on the drugs trade are often heavily contaminated. In one raid in 2002, £465,000 was found which had been stored in a room where heroin was being prepared, and was so heavily contaminated that officers were advised not to touch it without protective equipment.

Prior studies found that the level of contamination - i.e., the concentration of the contaminants - was different between those notes suspected to be used in the drug trade and those of proximity transfer levels. Subsequent tests have confirmed this determination, and serve as the basis for court cases against drug dealers, since the basic level of drug contamination remains fairly constant throughout the UK, despite factors that might immediately be thought to affect levels, like rural or urban environments, rich or poor or areas with high or low crime rates.

=== Hepatitis-C contamination ===
The contamination of paper money is not limited to simply that of cocaine and other illicit drugs. In 2006, the Hepatitis C trust warned of the risk of a "health time bomb" through Hepatitis-C transmission by banknotes used by drug users snorting cocaine. Drug users with hepatitis who share with others the rolled paper note (or straw) used to snort cocaine can facilitate the transfer of the disease. This is considered to be of particular concern, as eight out of ten carriers are unaware of their status (as hepatitis can lie dormant for decades). This higher risk for contracting hepatitis-C has also been noted by the American National Institutes of Health (NIH). Without treatment, hepatitis-C can lead to chronic liver disease.

The British Department of Health estimates that there are over 200,000 people infected with hepatitis C in Britain, but the number might be much higher. Charles Gore, the chief executive of the Hepatitis C Trust, said: "Estimates show that around 5,000 new cases of hepatitis C are diagnosed every year - but they are mainly through chance. Because so many are undiagnosed we can't tell what kind of problem we are looking at. When 5,000 banknotes were tested in London in 2000, 99% of them had traces of cocaine on them. That tells us that there is potentially a massive problem in diagnosis and people's awareness of how easily hepatitis C can be contracted."

Professor Graham Foster, of St Mary's Hospital, London, said: "Sharing banknotes or straws is a significant risk factor that people need to be more aware of. Although the risk of contracting hepatitis C through snorting is lower than through sharing a needle, it is still there."

== Europe ==
Similar contaminations have been found on euro banknotes from the Netherlands, Ireland, Spain, and Germany with the cocaine concentration being almost 100 times higher on the Spanish banknotes than on the German. Additionally, Germany had noted the unusual occurrences of German euros cracking and disintegrating after being withdrawn from ATMs, later explained as being caused by the sulfates used in the production of methamphetamine mixing with human sweat to form sulfuric acid, which breaks down the paper the euros are printed on. Most of the crystal methamphetamine present in Germany comes from Eastern Europe, and has a high level of sulfates.

== Elsewhere in the world ==
The longevity of most modern currency has also given rise to various fallacies regarding the transmission of bacteriological agents with paper banknotes. In early 2003, China placed banknotes under quarantine amid fears that SARS could be spread by the notes. Notes were held for 24 hours—the presumed lifespan of the virus. No evidence indicates that banknotes were an infection fomite in the 2002–2004 SARS outbreak. Similar concerns were raised during the onset of the COVID-19 pandemic in 2020, though further research conducted by the Bank of England found that banknotes were once again an unlikely fomite for transmitting the virus compared to contact with other objects and airborne transmission.

== See also ==
- United States dollar
- Cocaine in the United States
- Mutilated currency
