= Mutilated currency =

Physical damage to notes and coins

Video news report from Voice of America about mutilated currency and the methods used to determine aspects of the currency such as the denomination and total amount

Mutilated currency is a term used by the United States Bureau of Engraving and Printing (BEP) and the Bank of Canada to describe currency which is damaged to the point where it is difficult to determine the value of the currency, or where it is not clear that at least half of the note is present. Common causes of damage are fire, water damage, chemicals, explosives, damage caused by animals (including consumption of the currency) or damage from extended burying of the currency.

Replacement of mutilated currency is a free public service provided by the Bureau of Engraving and Printing. In general, mutilated U.S. paper currency can be submitted for evaluation. If it is determined that at least half of a bill is present, the BEP will redeem its face value. When there is less than 50% of a bill present, then if it can be identified as authentic U.S. currency, and that evidence demonstrates to the satisfaction of the Treasury Department that the missing portions have been destroyed, the face value of the bill will be redeemed in full.

Annually, the BEP handles approximately 30,000 claims, with currency redemptions valued at over $30 million.

The term is also used by the Bank of England in the United Kingdom, which will replace mutilated banknotes under a similar list of requirements and conditions to those used by the BEP.

== Classification ==
Banknotes which are merely very dirty, or very worn out, but where the value is clear, are not considered mutilated and can be either spent as normal or traded in at any bank, from where they will eventually be processed out of circulation.

== See also ==
- Contaminated currency – Paper currency with drug or disease residues
