= Mary Elizabeth Hickox Mandels =

American chemist

Dr Mary Elizabeth Hickox Mandels
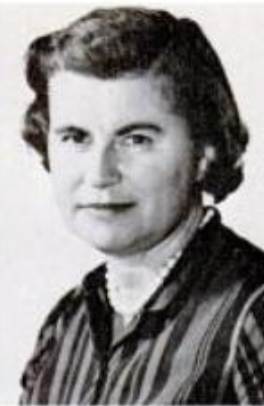
- Mary E. H. Mandels, from a 1975 publication of the United States Army
- Born: 12 September 1917; Middletown Springs, Vermont
- Died: 17 February 2008 (aged 90)
- Education: Botany BS, with minors in biochemistry and microbiology
- Alma mater: Cornell University
- Known for: cellulase enzymes, enzyme structure, large-scale enzyme production
- Spouse: Gabriel Mandels
- Awards: Research Directors Award, Quartermaster Research and Engineering Center (1962) US Army Hall of Fame (1998)
- Scientific career
- Institutions: US Army Natick Research Laboratory (NLABS)

Mary Elizabeth Hickox Mandels (September 12, 1917 – February 17, 2008) was an American scientist. Mandels was an early advocate for converting waste biomass to fuels and chemicals. She worked for forty years at the head of the US Army's national bioconversion studies.

== Early life ==
Mary Elizabeth Hickox was born to Sherman Gray and Mary Bolger Hickox in Middletown Springs, Vermont. Her family moved to Waterbury, Connecticut, where she lived with her parents and four siblings during the Great Depression.

== Education ==
Hickox was accepted to study at Cornell University in 1939, but her father had to be persuaded by her science teacher that she should attend. Fully behind her after his initial doubts, he insisted that she complete her education after the death of her mother, rather than return home to care for her siblings.

Hickox' university career was interrupted by World War II and she completed her studies in 1947. Whilst at Cornell, she met and married Gabriel Mandels, becoming Mary Elizabeth Hickox Mandels.

== Career ==
In 1955, Mandels began her research at the US Army Natick Laboratories. Mandel played a key role in clarifying the numerous components of the cellulase enzyme complex in moulds that had the ability to break down crystalline cellulose.

Mandels moved to the Food Science Laboratory in 1962, where she researched food production in "hostile" environments such as battlefields, Antarctica, or even space. Possibilities included single cell protein fermenter products and cellulolytic microbes.

In 1971 Mandels moved to the Bioengineering, Science and Advanced Technology Laboratory, and when Elwyn Reese retired in 1972 she became the head of this group.

In the early 1970s the oil crisis prompted Mandels and her team to focus their research upon the possibilities of using cellulose as an energy resource. It was essential to be able to measure cellulase activity, and Mandels developed an assay to predict the quantity of enzyme required. Subsequently, her paper 'Measurement of saccharifying cellulase' was the most cited paper in the journal Biotechnology for Biofuels in 1988, when it had been cited by over 330 publications.
