= Journal of Analytical Toxicology =

- Discipline: Toxicology
- Language: English
- Edited by: Bruce A. Goldberger

Publication details
- History: 1977-present
- Publisher: Oxford University Press
- Frequency: 9/year
- Impact factor: 3.367 (2020)

Standard abbreviations
- ISO 4: J. Anal. Toxicol.

Indexing
- CODEN: JATOD3
- ISSN: 0146-4760 (print); 1945-2403 (web)
- OCLC no.: 02942106

Links
- Journal homepage; Online access; Online archive

Journal of Analytical Toxicology (JAT) is a peer-reviewed scientific journal focusing on analytical toxicology.

According to Journal Citation Reports it received an impact factor of 3.513, ranking it 23rd out of 92 journals in the category "Toxicology" and 20th out of 86 journals in the category "Analytical Chemistry".

The editor is Bruce A. Goldberger (University of Florida, Gainesville). JAT is the official journal of the Society of Forensic Toxicologists.
