= Slang terms for money =

List of international slang

Slang terms for money often derive from the appearance and features of banknotes or coins, their values, historical associations or the units of currency concerned. Within a language community, some of the slang terms vary in social, ethnic, economic, and geographic strata but others have become the dominant way of referring to the currency and are regarded as mainstream, acceptable language (for example, "buck" for a dollar or similar currency in various nations including Australia, Canada, New Zealand, South Africa, Nigeria and the United States).

== Argentina ==
In Argentina, over the years and throughout many economic crises, several slang terms for money have emerged.

Seniors above 65 typically used "guita" to describe coins of a low denomination of cents ('centavos'), such as 2, 5 or 10 cent coins. "10 guitas" is 10 centavos. The word "guita" in Lunfardo (Buenos Aires slang) is nowadays synonymous with "money".

During the short period of the Austral, which replaced the traditional peso after the military junta, the word "palo" (stick) was used to describe a value to the "million" of australes or pesos, i.e. "2 palos" refers to 2 million pesos or australes.

During the government of president Carlos Menem, during the economic crisis, the word "luca" was used to refer to thousands of pesos, so "5 lucas" meant 5 thousand pesos. Lucas is a stereotypical male given name among Generation X in Argentina.

Another nickname for the singular peso is "mango", but it is considered redundant to say 35,000 "mangos" when it is equivalent to 35 "lucas". Furthermore, it is also considered redundant to say 1,000 "lucas" because it is equivalent to 1 "palo" (1 million pesos)

== Australia ==
=== Current denominations ===
The five-cent coin is sometimes referred to as "shrapnel" as the smallest remaining coin in value and physical size. This nickname was inherited from one- and two-cent coins when they were abolished in 1996. Similarly related (as is also used in the United Kingdom for pounds), "fivers" and "tenners" are relatively common expressions for five and ten dollars, respectively. "Beer tokens" can relate to any denomination or combination of. This is also in keeping with the reverse, in which "bottle tops" can be used as an expression of holding, offering, or having a low amount of money. One-dollar and two-dollar coins are also often referred to as "gold coins" due to their colour, especially at fundraisers.

A twenty-dollar note is called a "lobster" or redback because of its red colour.

A fifty-dollar note is also known colloquially as a "pineapple" or the "Big Pineapple" because of its yellow colour.

The $100 note is currently green and is known colloquially as a “watermelon”, but between 1984 and 1996 it was grey, and was called a grey nurse (a type of shark).

Modern polymer Australian notes have multiple nicknames and varying levels of usage dependant on location and socio-economic class. The notes most commonly receive their nicknames from the colour of the denomination. the $5 note is most commonly referred to as a "fiver" but also is sometimes nicknamed a "pink lady", or a "prawn". The $10 note is referred to as a "tenner" or again, less commonly, a "Blue Swimmer", other variations of this nickname exist such as the "blue grenadier", it may also rarely be called a "blue tongue", in reference to the Australian blue-tongue lizard. $20 notes are most often called a "lobbo" or "lobster", due to the red colour. By far the most commonly used slang for a modern Australian note is the $50 denomination, referred to as either a "pineapple", or a "fiddy". The $100 note is less common than the $50 note, and thereby nicknames vary a lot more, the most frequently used is a "watermelon", but is also referred to as a "granny smith" both due to the green colour, a "Bradman", in reference to Australian cricketer's 99.94 batting average by Sir Donald Bradman, or "melba", in reference to the late Australian opera singer on the note.

Australians also use terms such as “bucks” and “dough” for dollars.

In a Simpsons episode set in Australia, one character used the term "dollarydoos". A prank petition was later added by someone to Change.org in an attempt to change the official name of the Australian dollar, but it had no real support. This has often been incorrectly reported as a real attempt to change the name.

=== Former denominations ===
Pre-decimal currency in Australia had a variety of slang terms for its various denominations. The Australian threepence was referred to as a "trey" or a "trey bit", a name probably derived from old French meaning three. The sixpence was often referred to as a "zack", which was an Australian and New Zealander term referring to a coin of small denomination, probably derived from Zecchino. The term was also used to refer to short prison term such as six months. An Australian shilling, like its British counterpart, was commonly referred to as a "bob", and the florin was consequently known as "two bob". Similarly, one Australian pound was colloquially described as a "quid", "fiddly", or "saucepan", the latter as rhyming slang for "saucepan lid/quid". The five-pound note could be referred to as a "fiver", or its derivatives, "deep sea diver" and "sky diver".

A number of post-decimal denominations which have since been discontinued had their own nicknames. The two-dollar note was known as the "sick sheep" in reference to its green colour and the merino ram that it showed. The paper (first and second series) hundred-dollar note was nicknamed the "grey ghost", "grey nurse", or the "Bradman" in recognition of its proximity to the 99.94 batting average of cricketer Sir Donald Bradman.

== Canada ==
In Canada, the one-dollar coin is known as the loonie. This is because it bears an image of the common loon, a bird.

The two-dollar coin is known as the toonie, a portmanteau combining the number two with loonie. It is occasionally spelled twonie; Canadian newspapers and the Royal Canadian Mint use the toonie spelling.

Similar to the United States, 5 cent coins are called nickels (due to the metal they are made from), 10 cent coins are dimes, 25 cent coins are quarters or two bits. Dollar amounts are all also referred to as bucks.

A five-dollar note is known colloquially as a fin, a fiver, half a sawbuck.

A ten-dollar note is known colloquially as a ten-spot, a dixie, a sawbuck, or a tenner.

A one hundred-dollar note is known colloquially as a C-Note or a bill (e.g. $500 is 5 bills).

Discontinued since 2000, the former one thousand-dollar notes were occasionally referred to as "pinkies", because of their distinctive colour.

Since Canadians and Americans both refer to their respective currencies as "the dollar", and because the two countries tend to mingle both socially and in the media, there is a lot of overlap in slang terms for money. However, this usually only extends to terms that are not specific to one country or the other. For example, both Canadians and Americans refer to a $100 note as a C-note, but an American might refer to it as a Benjamin, or a "Benji" after its portrait of Benjamin Franklin.

In Canadian French, dollar amounts are often referred to as piasses in the same way that an English speaker would use the words "buck" or "bucks" in informal settings. The word piasse is derived from the word piastre.

== Czech Republic ==
A 5 Czech koruna (CZK) coin is called a bůr in Czech, the CZK 10 coin is called a pětka (lit. 'five'), the CZK 100 note is called a kilo – a reference to the kilogram, the CZK 500 note is called a pětibába (lit. 'five old woman') – a reference to the woman on its face, or a pětikilo (lit. 'five kilograms'), the CZK 1000 note is called a litr – a reference to the litre, and a sum of one million korunas is called a mega – a reference to the 10^{6} SI unit prefix. If someone has a large amount of money, but the exact amount is not known, people say je ve vatě (lit. 'he is in cotton wool') or je v balíku (lit. 'he is in a package').

All the Czech koruna coins may also be referred to with their value and the suffix -kačka, (lit. 'duck'), such as: jednikačka, dvoukačka, pětikačka, desetikačka, padesátikačka.

== Eurozone ==
Since its introduction in 1999, a number of slang terms for the euro have emerged, though differences between languages mean that they are not common across the whole of the eurozone. Some terms are inherited from the legacy currencies, such as quid from the Irish pound and various translations of fiver or tenner being used for notes. The German Teuro is a play on the word teuer, meaning 'expensive'. The Deutsche Mark was worth approximately half as much as the euro (the ratio was 1.95583:1) and some grocers and restaurants were accused of taking advantage of the smaller numbers to increase their prices by rounding to 2:1. I, in Portugal the same thing happened, and often the term "Aéreo" is used, with the meaning of "Aéreal", the currency that flies away. In Flanders the lower value copper coins are known as koper (copper) or rosse (roughly meaning "ginger", referring to the colour). Ege in Finland and Pavo (which is the usual Spanish translation of buck in movies or TV shows, where it refers to dollars) in Spain are also terms applied to the euro. In France, the term "balles", previously used for the franc, continues to be employed despite the difference in value (1€ = 6.56FrF).

== India ==
In India slang names for coins are more common than for the currency notes. For 5 paisa (100 paisa is equal to 1 Indian rupee) it is panji. A 10 paisa coin is called dassi and for 20 paisa it is bissi. A 25 paisa coin is called chavanni (equal to 4 annas) and 50 paisa is athanni (8 annas). However, in recent years, due to inflation, the use of these small value coins has declined, and so has the use of these slang terms. For larger amounts, 1 lakh = 100,000 and 1 crore = 10,000,000 (or in the Indian convention, 1,00,000 and 1,00,00,000 respectively). These are considered technical units in India (so not technically slang). (Note: India has a separate numeral system, which includes Lakh and Crore measurements. These units are taught in Indian schools as official measurements. (See Indian numbering system for more information))

Also, the word Chillar (aka Chiller) is used for small value coins.

== Indonesia ==
In Indonesia, the official term for money is uang, while the currency is rupiah (Rp). Common slang terms for money in Indonesia are duit, which usually refers to paper money; and perak (from silver) for coin.

Apart from all that, there is cuan from the Hokkien language brought by the Chinese Indonesian ethnic group, which has become more popular since the 2010s. However, before that there are Hokkien term for nominal money since the 20th century as follows:

Amount (rupiahs)	Name
50	gocap in coin (50 perak)
100	cepek in coin (100 perak).
500	gopek; in coin (500 perak).
1,000	seceng or ceceng; in coin (1000 perak)
2,000	noceng
5,000	goceng
10,000	ceban
50,000	goban
100,000	cepekceng
500,000	gopekceng
1,000,000	cetiao
5,000,000	gotiao

== Kenya ==
In Kenya there are about 42 different languages, which have different dialects and indigenous names for money, in addition to the official National languages of Swahili and English. In English, Kenyan currency is a Shilling while in Swahili it is "Shilingi". (Indeed, all East African countries refer to their money as Shillings.)

Other notable names include:

Slang term	Bantu-dialect	Nilotic-dialect
chapaa, pesa, munde, mundez, mulla, dough, ganji, cheddaz, cheddar/mkwanja	Mbesha	Otongloh/Mafarangah

In addition, youth have a sub-culture street language for the different denominations. Using the street slang (sheng), urbanites often amalgamate Swahili, English, and their mother-tongue to concoct meanings and names for the different denominations. Among the commonly used terms are:

	Image	Denomination	Designation	Nickname	Pronunciation
Coins		.01ct			ndururu / oruro
Coins		.10ct			peni
Coins		.50ct			sumuni
Coins		1.00	Ksh.1		bob/1bob (wan bob)shilingi
Coins		2.00	Kshs.2		
Coin & notes		5.00	Kshs.5		Ngovo/Guoko/kobuang'/kobole / Gongro
Coin & notes		10.00	Kshs.10		hashu/ikongo/kindee
Coin & notes		20.00	Kshs.20		dhanashara/mbao/blue
Coin		40.00	Kshs.40	Jongo/Kiroosi	Jongo ya tefo/Ki-roo-see (disambiguation for one of former Pres. Kibaki's wives: Mama Lucy Kibaki)
Notes		50.00	Kshs.50		hamsa/hamsini/finje/chuani/nich
Notes		100.00	Kshs.100		mia/soo/oss/red/kioo
Notes		200.00	Kshs.200		soo mbili/soo mbeh/rwabe
Notes		500.00	Kshs.500	five soc	soo tano/punch/jirongo
Notes		1000.00	Kshs.1000	1K	a thao/tenga/ngiri/ngwanye/bramba/ndovu/muti/kapaa/kei (for letter 'K') gee (for letter 'G')
Notes		1,000,000 (doesn't exist in notation)	Kshs.1,000,000	1mitre	mita moja

In writing, money is denoted by "Kshs" before or the slang notation "/=" after. For examples, Kshs.1.00 is one-bob, whereas 5,000/= is five-Kei.

Corruption is rampant in the Kenyan government, and corrupt officials in government agencies often refer to illicit kickbacks as "chickens" to avoid anti-corruption and money laundering enforcement.

== Malaysia ==
States in Malaysia have different terms for money. Normally, "cents" are called "sen", but in the northern region (Penang, Kedah, Perlis) one "kupang" is 10 sen, thus 50 sen is "5 kupang". "duit" (pronounce "do it") means "money", such as in "Saya tiada wang" ("I have no money").

In the East Coast Region (Kelantan, Terengganu, Pahang), "50 sen" is replaced with "samah" (where "se" refer to one in Malay). RM 1 (100 sen) is called "seya" ("dua" is two in Malay), and so on.

In Kelantan, "ringgit" is called "riyal". For example, RM 10 (10 ringgit) is called "10 riyal" in Kelantan.

In olden days, RM 10 was called "Red Tiger" because there was a watermark of tiger in a red tone on the RM 10 notes.

== Mexico ==
The mexican coin is called peso

Term	Denomination	Designation	Origin
Toston	0.5	coin	
Diego	10	coin	
Benito or Beny	20	bill	
Juana	200	bill	
Miguelito	1000	bill	

In general, money is referred to as "lana" (wool), "varo" or "feria" (change).

== Netherlands ==
Netherlands slang (straattaal = "street language")

5 cents : centoe, kleingeld, stuiver (in Amsterdam "bijssie")

10 cents: dubbeltje (double stuiver), "duppie"

25 cents: kwartje (a quarter of a guilder) (in Amsterdam "heitje")

1 euro : uru, djara, ballen (plural), e, ekkie, eu, eccie, pop (Previously when it was 1 Guilder – "piek")

2.5 Guilders: rijksdaalder (in Amsterdam "knaak")

5 euro: lotto, vijfje ("fiver")

10 euro: donnie, tientje ("tenner"), joet (after yodh, the tenth letter in the Hebrew alphabet) – (in Amsterdam "joet")

25 euro: twaja donnie, geeltje ("yellow one", the former guilder banknote used to be yellow from 1861 until 1909) There is no 25 Euro bill; only a 20 Euro)

50 euro: bankoe

100 euro: barkie, meier (after mea, Hebrew for 100), mud (unit of volume, derived from Latin modius; used to be 100 litres after 1820), snip (the old guilder banknote once had a snipe on it)

1000 euro: doezoe, mille (from French word for thousand), rooie/rooie rug/rug ("red one, red back, back", the former guilder banknote once had a red backside), kop ("head")

100,000 euro: ton

1,000,000 euro: milli

1,000,000,000 euro: billi

1,000,000,000,000 euro: trill, trilly

1,000,000,000,000,000 euro: gerro/gerry

== New Zealand ==
In New Zealand one-dollar and two-dollar coins are often referred to as "gold coins". This presumably comes from the term "gold coin donation", which is widely used in New Zealand in schools on days such as mufti day, or as koha at a public event.

A one-dollar coin is also simply known as a "kiwi", and the currency as a whole is known is banking and related industry circles as "the Kiwi" or "the Kiwi dollar".

Much like their use in other countries, the terms "Fiver" (and rarely "an Edmund" after the image of Sir Edmund Hillary on the note), "Tenner", "Fiddy", and "Hundo" are used for a five-dollar, ten-dollar, fifty-dollar, and hundred-dollar note respectively. As in other countries, a sum of $1000 is known as a "grand".

Prior to decimalisation in 1967, New Zealand slang terms for coins were largely identical to terms used in the United Kingdom and Australia.

== Poland ==
Money in Poland is referred to as “kasa” (cash), “Kapucha” (cabbage) and “dutki” (ducats). With the younger generation the word “hajs” is very popular. The Groszy coins are colloquially referred to as “grosisze” and “grosiaki”, whereas the złoty coins are referred to as “zyle” and złocisze. Any number of złoty under 10 can also be named “blach/y” (sheets of metal).

Term	Denomination	Designation	Origin
Miedziaki	1, 2, 5	1, 2, 5 gr coins	polish word for copper
złotówka	1	1 zł coin	wordplay on 1 złoty
dwójka	2	2 zł coin	literally means “a two”
piątak	5	5 zł coin	literally means “a five-ing”
dycha, dyszka	10	a 10 zł bill	
dwie dychy, dwie dyszki	20	20 zł bill	
pięć dych, pięć dyszek	50	50 zł bill	
stówa, stówka, bańka	100	100 zł bill	
dwie stówy, dwie bańki	200	200 zł bill	
tysiak, kafel	1 000	1 000 zł	“tysiak” is a wordplay and “kafel” is tile
duża bańka	100 000	100 000 zł	literally “large bank”

== Russia ==
General money slang

Generally slang terms for money are following:
"b′abki" – from Czech small anvil for making coins ("b′abka", pl. "b′abki"). Alternatively, the term may be derived from the literal meaning ("grandmas") and refer to the image of Catherine the Great on imperial 100 rouble banknotes.
"babl′o" – slang from "b′abki"
"lav′ae" – used since the 1990s, comes from gypsy word "lavae" means silver. Russian writer Victor Pelevin gives an alternative witty consumeristic meaning to this word. In his book "Generation P" he interprets "lav′ae" as a spelled out abbreviation "LV" which stands for liberal values.
"kap′u:sta" – means cabbage
"derevy′anniy" – a general name for a rouble, a substantive adj. "wooden". Means that rouble is cheap as it is made of wood.

Expressions
"strich bablo" – verb "strich" means "to cut", "to trim" money like from the hedge (also "strich kapu:stu", "strich lavae")
"kos′it' babl′o" – "to mow money" (also "kos′it' kap′u:stu", "kos′it' lav′ae"), similar to "trim money"
Both expressions mean to earn money in big amounts (usually refers to illegal ways) or to collect money from someone.

Coins

The Russian language has slang terms for various amounts of money. Slang names of copeck coins derive from old Russian pre-decimal coins and are rarely in use nowadays: an "altyn" is three copecks, a "grivennik" is ten copecks, a "pyatialtynny" ("five-altyns") is fifteen copecks, and a "dvugrivenny" ("two-grivenniks") is 20 copecks. Most of these coins are of Soviet mint and no longer used; only the ten copeck coin remains in circulation.

1 copeck – "kop′eyechka" (diminutive from copeck)
3 copecks – "alt′yn"
10 copecks – "gr′ivennik"
15 copecks – "pyatialt′ynny" ("five-altyns")
20 copecks – "dvugr′ivenny" ("two-grivenniks")

Bills

The word "cherv′onets" means ten rubles and refers to an early 20th-century gold coin of the same name. It is also called "ch′irik" (a diminutive for "cherv′onets"). The words for bank notes from 50 to 1000 rubles are the newest and most modern, since currently (2000s-2010s) bank notes of this value are most common in circulation. 50 rubles are called "polt′innik" (an old word that originally meant 50 copecks), 100 rubles are called "st′ol'nik" (a neologism from the Russian word "sto", meaning "100", not related to the Muscovite office of the same name), 500 rubles are called "pyatih′atka" (lit. "five huts"), "fiol′et" ("violet", because of the note's color), and 1000 rubles are called "sht′u:ka" (means "item", "pack" – 1990-s slang for a pack of bills 100x10RUB or 100x10USD), "kus′ok" ("piece", "pack" – also refers to a 100x10RUB pack); or "kos′ar'" – (form "k′oso" – adv. "aslope") initially refers to a fact that in the 1910–20s the number "1000" was printed on the note at 45°. The word "kos′ar'" (homonymic meaning is "mower") can also be referred to another money slang expression "kos′it' babl′o" – "to mow money" – to earn money in big amounts (usually refers to illegal ways).

10 RUB – "cherv′onets" (from Slav. "cherv′oniy" – red, refer to a colour the note was in Soviet times), "ch′irik" (a diminutive for chervonets)
50 RUB – "polt′innik" (substantive from "five-altyns")
100 RUB – "stol'nik", "s′o:tka", "sot′el" (informal substantives from "sto" – one hundred)
500 RUB – "pyatis′otka"(substantive from "pyat's′ot" – five hundred), "pyatih′utka" (lit. "five huts")", "fiol′et" ("violet" refers to a note colour), "pieh'ota" (derivative from "pyat's'ot" with original word meaning infantry)
1000 RUB – "sht′u:ka", "shtu:k′ar'" ("item", "pack" – 1990-s slang for a pack of bills 100x10RUB or 100x10USD)", "kus′ok" ("piece", "pack" – also refers to a 100x10RUB pack); "kos′ar'" ("slopped"), "rubl'"
5000 RUB – "pit′orka", "pit′ora" ("a fiver"), "pyat' shtuk" (five packs, five packs of 100x10RUB), "pyat' kosar′ey", "pyat' kusk′o:v", "pyat' rubl'ey"

Slang words for greater amounts of money originate from the 1990s and the Russian Civil War eras, when the ruble was suffering hyperinflation. For a million rubles the most common are "limon" (lemon), "lyam" (short from "limon") and for a billion "arbuz" (watermelon). Word "limon" appeared in the 1990s when rouble lost its value.

1 000 000 RUB – "lim′o:n" (lemon), "lyam" (short from "limon")
1 000 000 000 RUB – "yard" (milliard), "arb′u:z" (watermelon)

== Slovakia ==
From 1993 to 2008, Slovakia used its own currency, slovenská koruna (Slovak crown), instead of Euro. During this period, slang words for greater amounts of money were established, including "kilo" (slang for kilogram) for one hundred crowns, "liter" (liter) for one thousand crowns and "melón" (melon) for one million crowns. These slang words are still used after 2008, albeit less frequently.

== South Africa ==
Decimal currency was introduced in 1961, when the South African pound, previously based on the United Kingdom currency, was replaced by the rand (symbol R) at the rate of 2 rand to 1 pound, or 10 shillings to the rand. Thus the United Kingdom term "bob" for a shilling equates to 10 cents.

South African slang for various amounts of money borrows many terms from the rest of the English speaking world, such as the word "grand" when referring to R1,000. Other words are unique to South Africa, such as the term "choc" when referring to a R20 note. One "bar" refers to an amount of R1,000,000.

Among the English speaking communities "Bucks" is commonly used to refer to Rands (South African Currency). Less commonly used is the Afrikaans slang for Rands which is "Bokke", the plural of Bok; The Afrikaans word for antelope ("Bucks" being the English equivalent), derived from the Springbok image on the old R 1 coin. e.g. R 100 = 100 Bucks/Bokke, R 5 = 5 Bucks/Bokke etc.

Outside the English speaking community, especially in the black communities there are various words used to describe money. Some of these words have even become part of the general South Africa slang. These are some of the common words:

1. Chankura.
2. Nyuku.
3. Sjwevu.
4. Chweba.
5. Bhonyoro.
6. Manizadi.
7. Sobho.
8. Sgura.
9. Zaka.
10. Moola.

Term	Denomination	Designation	Origin
2 Bob	.20	a 20 cent coin	United Kingdom 2 shillings
5 Bob	.50	a 50 cent coin	United Kingdom 5 shillings
Younga	1	a R1	
Boice	2	a R2 coin	township slang
Zuka	2	a R2	
Tiger	10	a R10 note	township slang
Chocko	20	a R20 note	township slang
5 Tiger	50	a R50 note	township slang
Pinkies	50	a R50 note	due to the note's colour
Jacket	50	a R50 note	township slang
1 Sheet	100	a R100 note	township slang
Clipa	100	a R100	township slang
Stena		an amount of R1,000	from the township word for brick
Grand		an amount of R1,000	United Kingdom
Bar		an amount of R1,000,000	Durban slang
Yard		an amount of R1,000,000,000	Banking slang
Meter	1,000,000	an amount of R1,000,000	township slang

== Sweden ==
In Sweden money in general is colloquially referred to by the words stålar, kosing, deg ("dough") or older klöver ("clover") and the English loanword cash. With Rinkeby Swedish and the Swedish hip hop scene para has been introduced. It is a loanword from Serbo-Croat-Bosnian and Turkish, originating from the Ottoman currency para. Slang terms for the Swedish krona in use today include spänn and bagis. Riksdaler (referring riksdaler, the former Swedish currency) is still used as a colloquial term for the krona in Sweden. A 20-kronor banknote is sometimes called selma, referring to the portrait of Selma Lagerlöf on the older version of the note.

Term	Denomination	Designation	Origin
guldmynt	10	10 kr coin	10 kr coins used to be called ”guldmynt” (gold coin) for kids
Astrid	20	20 kr bill	depicting Astrid Lindgren
halvhunka	50	a 50 kr bill	wordplay of “hundring” and then half of that
hunka	100	a 100 kr bill	wordplay of “hundring”
tvåhunka	200	200 kr bill	wordplay of “hundring” and then double of that
röding	500	500 kr bill	“röd” meaning red refers to the color of the banknote
lax	1 000	1 000 kr bill	“Lax” meaning salmon refers to the color of bills in use 1894-1950which had a pink/orange color like salmon meat.
lakan	1 000	1 000 kr bill	comes from slang of the bills between 1952-1973 when these banknotes were big, “lakan” meaning bed sheet.
långsjal	1 000	1 000 kr bill	"Långsjal" meaning long shawl as between 1976-1988 the bill was long with low height. In the 19th century it was for bills of 100 riksdaler.
skjorta	10 000	10 000 kr	used in Östermalm, Stockholm
kanin	1 000 000	1 000 000 kr	meaning “rabbit”, comes from Egyptian arabic
hare	10 000 000	10 000 000 kr	means “hare” and refers to being bigger than “kanin” (rabbit)
valross	100 000 000	100 000 000 kr	meaning “walrus”
knölval	1 000 000 000	1 000 000 000 kr	meaning “humpback whale” and derives from the investment term

== United Kingdom ==
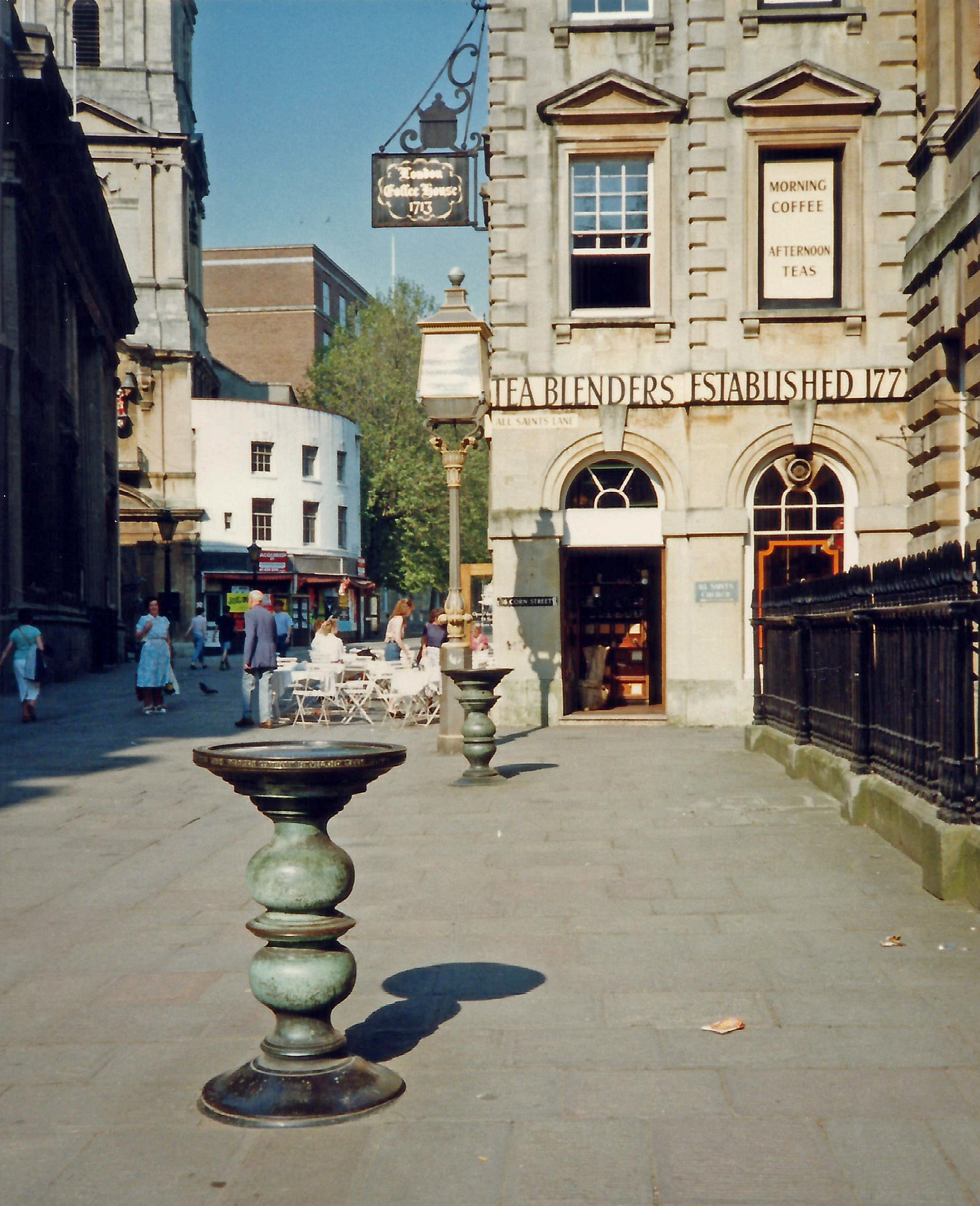
The Nails in Bristol, over which cash transactions were made

Ready money (i.e. cash) has been referred to in the United Kingdom as "dosh" since at least 1953; Brewer equates this term with "paying through the nose", dosh being a Russian-Jewish prefix referring to the nose, that is, paying in cash. The phrase "ready money" has also given rise to the far more popular "readies", though there is debate as to whether this is an obvious reference to the availability of the currency or the red and white colour of the British ten shilling Treasury note of 1914. The related term "cash on the nail" is said to refer to 17th century trading stands in Bristol and elsewhere, over which deals were done and cash changed hands. Another British term for money is "Brass" it is believed to have originated from the region’s scrap dealers looking for materials that were valuable, like brass. It's related to the phrase “Where there's muck, there's brass.”

Other general terms for money include "bread" (Cockney rhyming slang 'bread & honey', money; this also became dough, by derivation from the same root), "cabbage", "clam", "milk", "dosh", "dough", "shillings", "frogskins", "notes", "ducats" (pronounced "duckets"), "loot", "bones", "bar", "coin", "folding stuff", "honk", "lampshade", "lolly", "lucre"/"filthy lucre", "p", "moola/moolah", "mazuma", "paper", "scratch", "readies", "rhino" (Thieves' cant), "spondulicks/spondoolic(k)s/spondulix/spondoolies" and "wonga".

Quid (singular and plural) is used for pound sterling or £, in British slang. It is thought to derive from the Latin phrase "quid pro quo". A pound (£1) may also be referred to as a "nicker" or "nugget" (rarer).

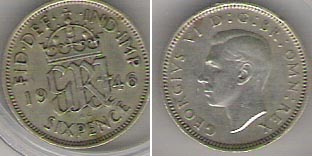
A 1946 "tanner"

Some other pre-decimal United Kingdom coins or denominations became commonly known by colloquial and slang terms, perhaps the most well known being "bob" for a shilling. A farthing was a "mag", three farthings was "the sun, moon and stars" (three far things...), a silver threepence was a "joey" and the later nickel-brass threepence was called a "thruppenny bit" (/ˈθrʌpni/, /ˈθrʊpni/ or /ˈθrɛpni/); a sixpence was a "tanner", the two-shilling coin or florin was a "two-bob bit", the two shillings and sixpence coin or half-crown was a "half dollar" and the crown was a "dollar". Slang terms are not generally used for the decimal coins that replaced them but in some parts of the country, "bob" continues to represent one-twentieth of a pound, that is five new pence and two bob is 10p. The round £1 coin in circulation between 1983 and 2017 became widely known as a "Maggie" following its introduction by Margaret Thatcher's government. For all denominations "p" is used for pence.

In the United Kingdom the term "shrapnel" may be used for an inconvenient pocketful of change because of the association with a shrapnel shell and "wad", "wedge" or "wodge" for a bundle of banknotes, with "tightwad" a derogatory term for someone who is reluctant to spend money. Similar to "shrapnel" the use of "washers" in Scotland denotes a quantity of low value coinage. Quantities of UK 1p and 2p coins may be referred to as "Copper", 5p, 10p, 20p, and 50p coins as "Silver" and £1 and £2 coins as "Bronze" due to their colour and apparent base metal type. "Brass" is northern English slang for any amount of money.

The one pound note, while still in circulation in Scotland, was occasionally referred to as a "Sheet" and thus the ten shilling note as a "Half Sheet". More commonly the ten shilling note was a "ten bob note" or, in London, "half a bar". "As bent as a nine bob note" is or was a common colloquial phrase used to describe something or someone crooked or counterfeit, or alternatively (and now considered offensive) a gay man who is extremely camp.

In pub culture five and ten pound notes are sometimes called "blue beer tokens" and "brown beer tokens" respectively.

Many of the following are largely obsolete, or otherwise not in common use.

£5 is commonly called a "fiver", and more rarely a "Lady" (short for "Lady Godiva") due to rhyming slang or a "Deep Sea Diver" or a "Winston" from the image of Winston Churchill on the back of the new note introduced in 2016.
£10 is commonly known as a "tenner" or, more uncommonly, a "Darwin", due to the image of Charles Darwin on the back (issued from 7 November 2000 and withdrawn from circulation on 1 March 2018). Other terms used are a "Cockle" from Cock and Hen – ten and "Ayrton", from Ayrton Senna i.e. tenner.
£15 is sometimes referred to as a Commodore as it is worth three "Ladies" (see above) after the Commodores' song "Three Times a Lady".
£20 is sometimes referred to as a "score", although strictly this is not a slang term for money, as 'score' is a normal word for twenty. £20 is sometimes known as a "Bobby" from Bobby Moore (rhymes with score).
£25 is known as a "pony". In city of London trading floor slang it was also known as a "roast" (two Ayrtons and a lady), a quarter or a daughter (rhyming with quarter).
£50 is known as a "bullseye" (from the points value of the bullseye on a darts board).
£100 is sometimes referred to as a "ton" e.g. £400 would be called 4 ton. Also, a "century" or a "bill" have been used for this value.
£500 is known as a "monkey".
£1,000 is commonly referred to as a grand, e.g., £4,000 would be called 4 grand, or rarely in certain dialects as a "bag" (from the rhyming slang "Bag of Sand"). In some cases, £1,000 is known as one large, i.e., £10,000 would be ten large. £2,000 has been known as an Archer, having been coined by Rik Mayall's character, Alan B'stard, in TV comedy The New Statesman.

A "oner" (one-er) has referred to various amounts from one shilling to a pound, to now meaning £100 or £1,000, and a "big one" denoting £1,000. A "oncer" referred particularly to a one-pound note, now defunct.

In London financial culture, a billion pounds or, more often, US dollars, is referred to as a 'yard'. This derives from the old British English word for a thousand million, a milliard, which has now been replaced by the 'short scale' name 'billion' from US English. The term 'million' for a million pounds or dollars is often dropped when it is clear from context. E.g. "He made three quid last year" would mean "He earned three million pounds".

== United States ==
Common slang terms for money in general:

- bacon
- bag
- big ones
- bills
- bones
- bread
- bucks
- cabbage
- cash
- cake
- cheddar
- cheese
- chicken
- coin
- cream
- dead presidents
- dough
- green
- greenbacks
- guala
- guap
- loot
- nine-grain bread
- paper
- quiche
- rack
- scratch
- scrilla
- stash
- wad
- ziti

Common slang terms specifically denoting $1,000 U.S. Dollars:

- G (shortened form of "grand")
- grand
- K (from kilo; typically prefixed with a number ≥ 2, e.g. 50K, which would equal $50,000)
- large (typically prefixed with a number ≥ 2, e.g. 10 large, equalling $10,000)
- rack (from American casinos, where $1,000 worth of chips would be given/transported in a carrying rack)

Older-fashioned, but still widely known terms:

- beans
- celery
- chips
- clams
- doubloons
- ducats
- grease
- lettuce
- moolah
- salad
- simoleons
- smackers
- smackeroos
- smackeroonies
- sour cream
- spondulix
- tamales
- tender

U.S. coinage nicknames reflect their value, composition and tradition.

- The one-cent coin ($0.01 or 1¢) is commonly called a penny due to historical comparison with the British penny. Older U.S. pennies, prior to 1982, are sometimes called "coppers" due to being made of 95% copper. Pennies dated 1909–1958, displaying wheat stalks on the reverse, are sometimes called "wheaties" or "wheat-backs", while 1943 steel wheat cents are sometimes nicknamed "steelies".
- The five-cent coin ($0.05 or 5¢) is commonly called a nickel due to being made of 25% nickel since 1866. Nickels minted between 1942 and 1945 are nicknamed 'war nickels' owing to their different metal content, removing the nickel for a mixture of silver, copper and manganese.
- The quarter dollar coin ($0.25 or 25¢) is commonly shortened to quarter, it used to be called two-bits (see below) as well, but this is falling out of use.
- The half dollar coin ($0.50 or 50¢) is commonly shortened to half and is also sometimes called a 50-cent piece, it used to be called four-bits (see below) as well, but this is falling out of use.

Dimes and quarters used to be sometimes collectively referred to as "silver" due to their historic composition of 90% silver prior to 1965.

A bit is an antiquated term equal to one eighth of a dollar or 12 1/2 cents, after the Spanish 8-Real "piece of eight" coin on which the U.S. dollar was initially based. So "two bits" is twenty-five cents; similarly, "four bits" is fifty cents. More rare are "six bits" (75 cents) and "eight bits" meaning a dollar. These are commonly referred to as two-bit, four-bit, six-bit and eight-bit.

U.S. banknote nicknames reflect their values (such as five, twenty, etc.), the subjects depicted on them and their color.

- $1 bill is sometimes called a "single", a "buck", a "simoleon" or a George or rarely an "ace". The dollar has also been referred to as a "bean" or "bone" (e.g. twenty bones is equal to $20).
- $2 bill is sometimes referred to as a "deuce" or a "tom".
- $5 bill has been referred to as an "Abe", "fin", "fiver" or "five-spot".
- $10 bill is a "sawbuck", a "ten-spot", or a "Hamilton".
- $20 bill as a "Jackson", or a "dub", or a "double sawbuck".
- Among horse-race gamblers, the $50 bill is called a "frog" and is considered unlucky. It is sometimes referred to as a "Grant".
- $100 bill is occasionally a "band" or "C-note" (C being the Roman numeral for 100, from the Latin word centum) or "century note"; it's more commonly referred to as a "Benjamin" or "Benny" (after Benjamin Franklin, who is pictured on the note), or a "yard" (so $300 is "3 yards" and a $50 bill is a "half a yard"). "A stack" is $1,000 in the form of ten $100 bills, banded by a bank or otherwise.
- Amounts above 1000 US dollars are occasionally referred to as "large" ("twenty large" being $20,000, etc.). In slang, a thousand dollars may also be referred to as a "grand" or "G", "K" (as in kilo), or less commonly a "stack", a "bozo", as well as a "band". For example, "The repairs to my car cost me a couple grand" or "The repairs to my car cost me a couple [of] stacks".
- 1,000 US dollars is called a "rack", or rarely, a "d-note".
- 10,000 US dollars is called a "stack".
- 100,000 US dollars is called a "brick" or a "honey bun".

Banknotes may be collectively referred to as "dead Presidents", although neither Alexander Hamilton ($10) nor Benjamin Franklin ($100) was President. These are also referred to as "wallet-sized portraits of Presidents" – referring to the fact that people typically carry pictures in their wallets.

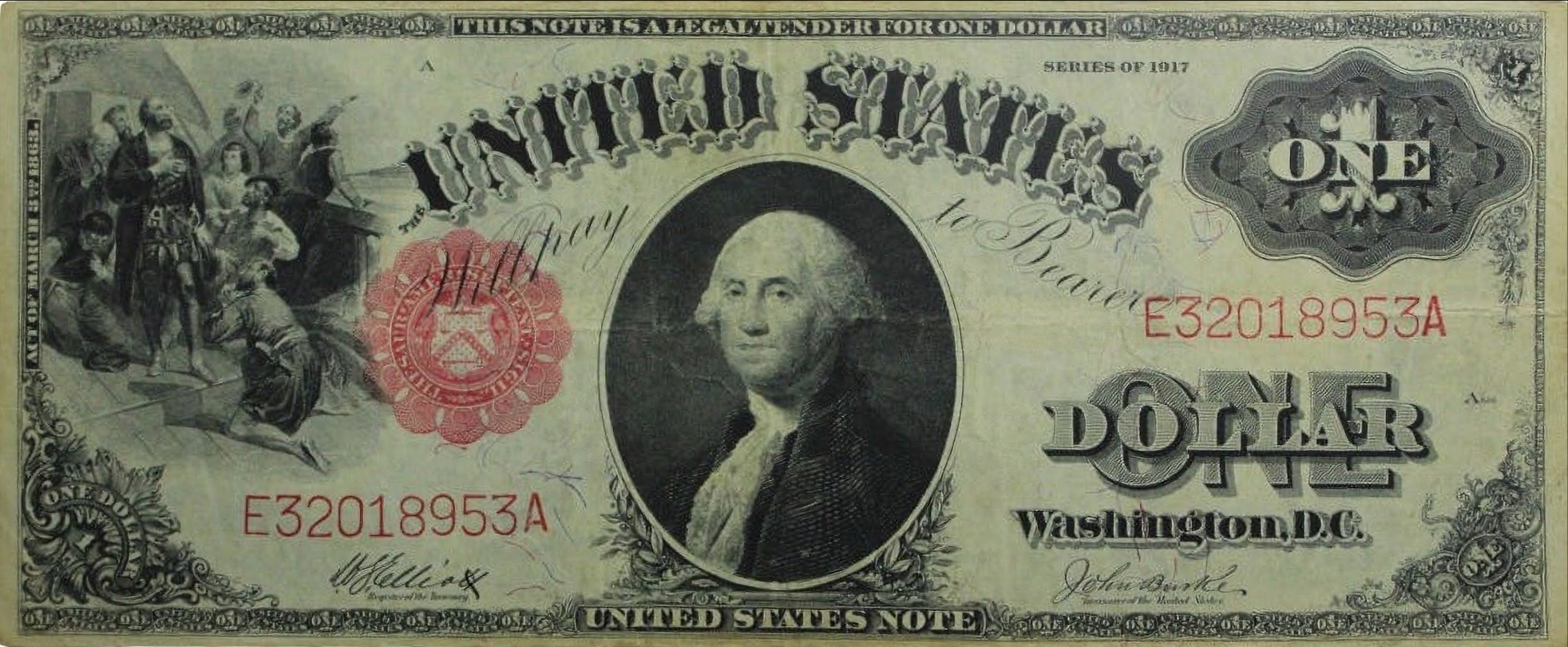
1917 "greenback"

"Greenback" originally applied specifically to the 19th century Demand Note dollars created by Abraham Lincoln to finance the costs of the American Civil War for the North. The original note was printed in black and green on the back side. It is still used to refer to the U.S. dollar (but not to the dollars of other countries).

Other more general terms for money, not specifically linked to actual banknotes:

- Monetary units larger than 1 dollar are often referred to by the names of their coin counterparts: $5 is a "nickel", $10 is a "dime", and $25 is a "quarter".
- A one hundred dollar bill can also be called a buck, or a "dollar", but since a buck is also used for one dollar, the context needs to be clear (this continues the pattern of referring to values by the coin counterpart).
- A "hoka" is used to express a large sum of money, usually between ten thousand and fifty thousand dollars.
- A million dollars is sometimes called a "closet" or a "rock", popularized by several TV shows and movies. On The Sopranos: in one episode Tony Soprano states, "So adjusting for inflation I'm looking at half a rock?" In a separate episode, Soprano states: "This whole thing is going to cost me close to a rock." Another slang term for a million dollars is an "M", as used in rap songs. Financial institutions and applications will often use "MM" when writing shorthand for a million dollars, as a million is the product of the Roman numeral "M" (1000) times itself. More common usage is a "mil".
- A "yard" is a financial term for one billion dollars, deriving from the French word of the same meaning, "milliard", pronounced 'meel-yard'.

== See also ==
- Money
- Digital currency
- World currency

== Notes ==
=== Bibliography ===
- Brewer, E. Cobham (1978). Brewer's Dictionary of Phrase and Fable. Avenel Books. ISBN 0-517-25921-4.
