= Ten Spot =

Ten Spot may refer to:

- Ten Spot, Kentucky, an unincorporated community in Harlan County
- 10 Spot, a defunct programming block on MTV
- Slang for the United States ten-dollar bill, see Slang terms for money
