= Sawbuck table =

Type of trestle table

A sawbuck table or X-frame table is a type of trestle table having X-shaped supports at either end. It takes its name from the similarity of these X-shaped supports to sawbucks. In addition to the supports, a sawbuck table is distinguished by a sturdy central rail and key-tenon joints holding the supports and central rail together. Historically, sawbuck tables also often featured footrests running the length of the table.

The sawbuck table originated in Pennsylvania in the early 18th century, and is a characteristic example of Pennsylvania Dutch vernacular design. The design is sufficiently sturdy that some sawbuck tables have remained in regular use for over 200 years.

The earliest known modern picnic table was derived from the sawbuck table design, with the addition of attached benches on either side. Picnic table builders continued to experiment with sawbuck designs having separate benches until the invention of the modern A-frame picnic table in 1926. Sawbuck-style picnic tables continue to be used, for example for backyard applications where attached seating is not required.
