= 2-bit =

2-bit may refer to:

- 2-Bit, fictional character from The Power Universe
- 2-bit color, in computing
- 2 Bit Pie, an English electronic music group
- 2-bit architecture, used in some bit-slice processors

== See also ==
- Bit
- Two bits (disambiguation)
- Dibit
- Crumb (unit)
