= Picnic table =

Table with benches designed for outdoor dining

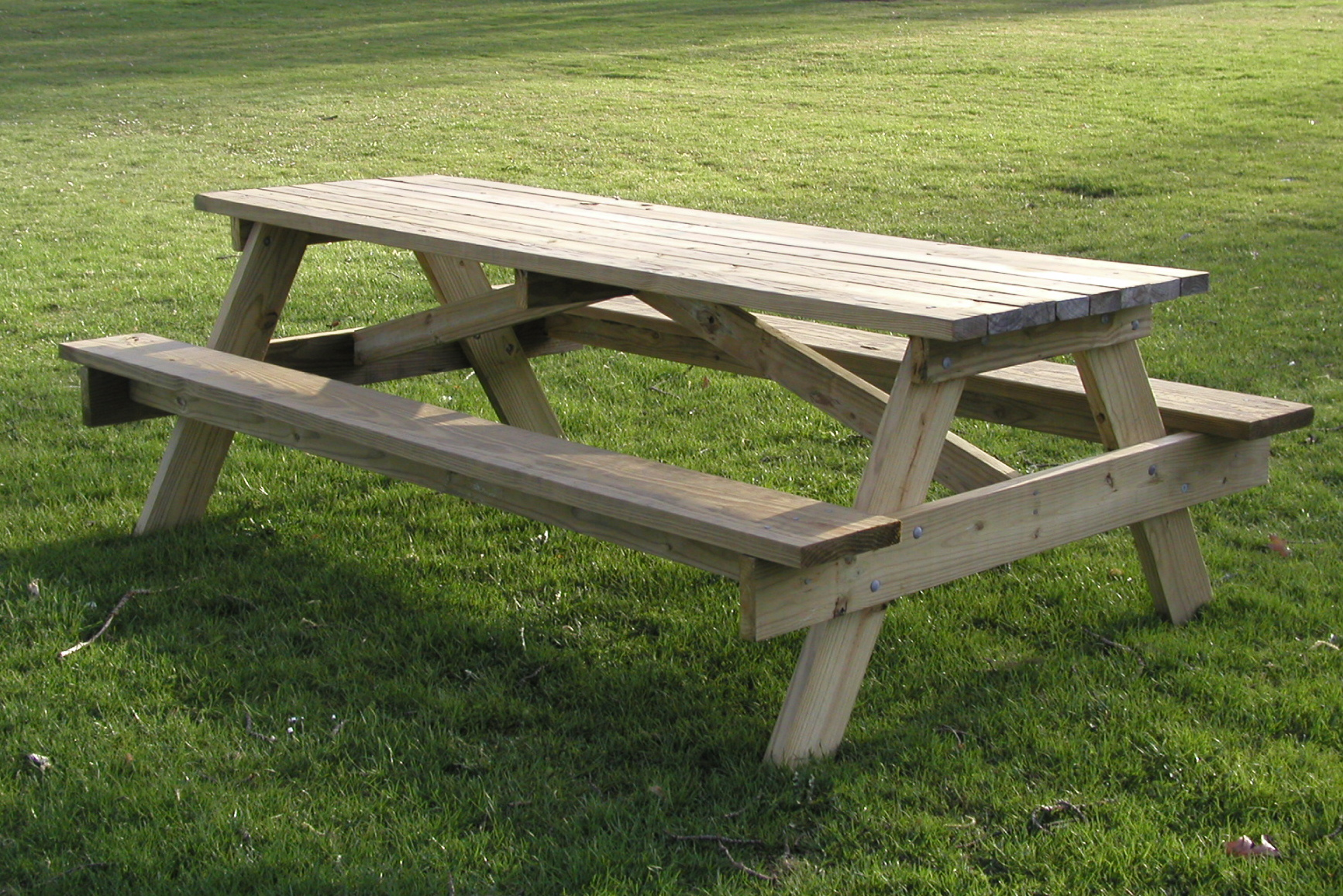
A wooden A-frame picnic table.

A picnic table (or picnic bench) is a table with benches (often attached), designed for outdoor dining. The term is often specifically associated with rectangular tables having an A-frame structure. Such tables may be referred to as "picnic tables" even when used exclusively indoors.

Various types of tables have been used for outdoor dining throughout history, but the classic A-frame rectangular picnic table emerged in the United States in the early 20th century. The earliest similar table was described in 1903 and was based on the 18th-century sawbuck table; the most common modern design, known initially as a "Lassen table", was first used in 1926.

While the original and most common material for picnic tables is wooden boards, they may be made of anything from split logs to concrete to recycled HDPE plastic. The frame, benches and platform may also be made of different materials.

Picnic tables are made in various shapes, from circles to hexagons, and in a wide range of sizes. Traditional picnic tables often pose challenges for accessibility, especially for wheelchair users, but various designs for accessible picnic tables also exist.

The standard US road sign for a picnic area depicts an A-frame picnic table

The typically simple and informal design of picnic tables makes them popular amenities in parks and other public places. They are used for a wide range of dining, educational, recreational and community-building purposes. Their popularity has various impacts on the flora, fauna and soil around picnic table sites, where they often attract various species interested in feeding on human food. Picnic tables are also common targets of vandalism.

== History ==
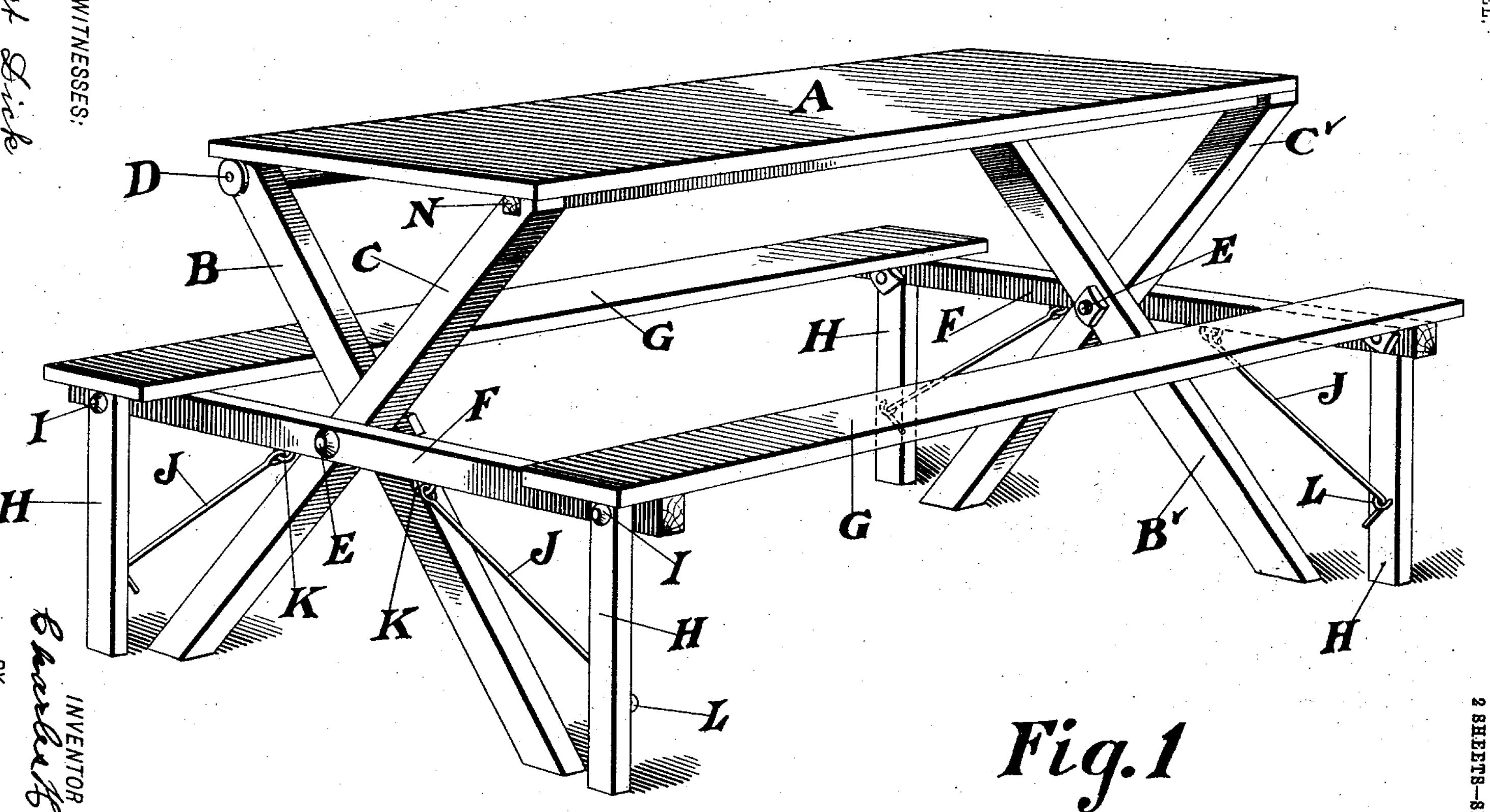
Illustration from the Nielsen 1903 picnic table patent.

Picnic tables emerged from the Victorian tradition of picnics, which often involved either simply spreading a blanket on the ground, or bringing the whole apparatus of indoor dining to the outdoors. This early approach to picnicking suffered the drawback that indoor dining furniture could not be carried far from the home and was often unsuited to outdoor use.

The first known modern picnic table was documented in a 1903 patent application by Charles H. Nielsen of Kreischerville, New York, US. Nielsen's table was designed to be portable and collapsible, so that picnickers could carry it wherever they wished. While the Nielsen table design derived its leg structure from the 18th-century sawbuck table, its built-in seating was innovative.

With the rise of US national parks and forests in the early 20th century, the use of fixed picnic tables as a park amenity became increasingly common. In many cases picnic tables were used specifically to restrict human impacts on the surrounding natural area, and were accordingly designed to be as heavy and immovable as possible.

Initially, a variety of picnic table designs were attempted. A sawbuck table with detached benches was popular in the early 1920s, but proved unsatisfactory in public parks because the benches tended to disappear. Other designs failed because they were either structurally unsound or difficult to construct.

The classic A-frame picnic table design, which overcame these early difficulties, originated at Lassen National Forest in California in 1926, and was accordingly known within the US Forest Service as a "Lassen table". The now-iconic Lassen tables became common across the United States through the work of the Civilian Conservation Corps in the 1930s.

The first known roadside picnic table was erected in 1929 in Boston Township, Michigan, US, using planks reclaimed from highway guardrails.

== Uses ==
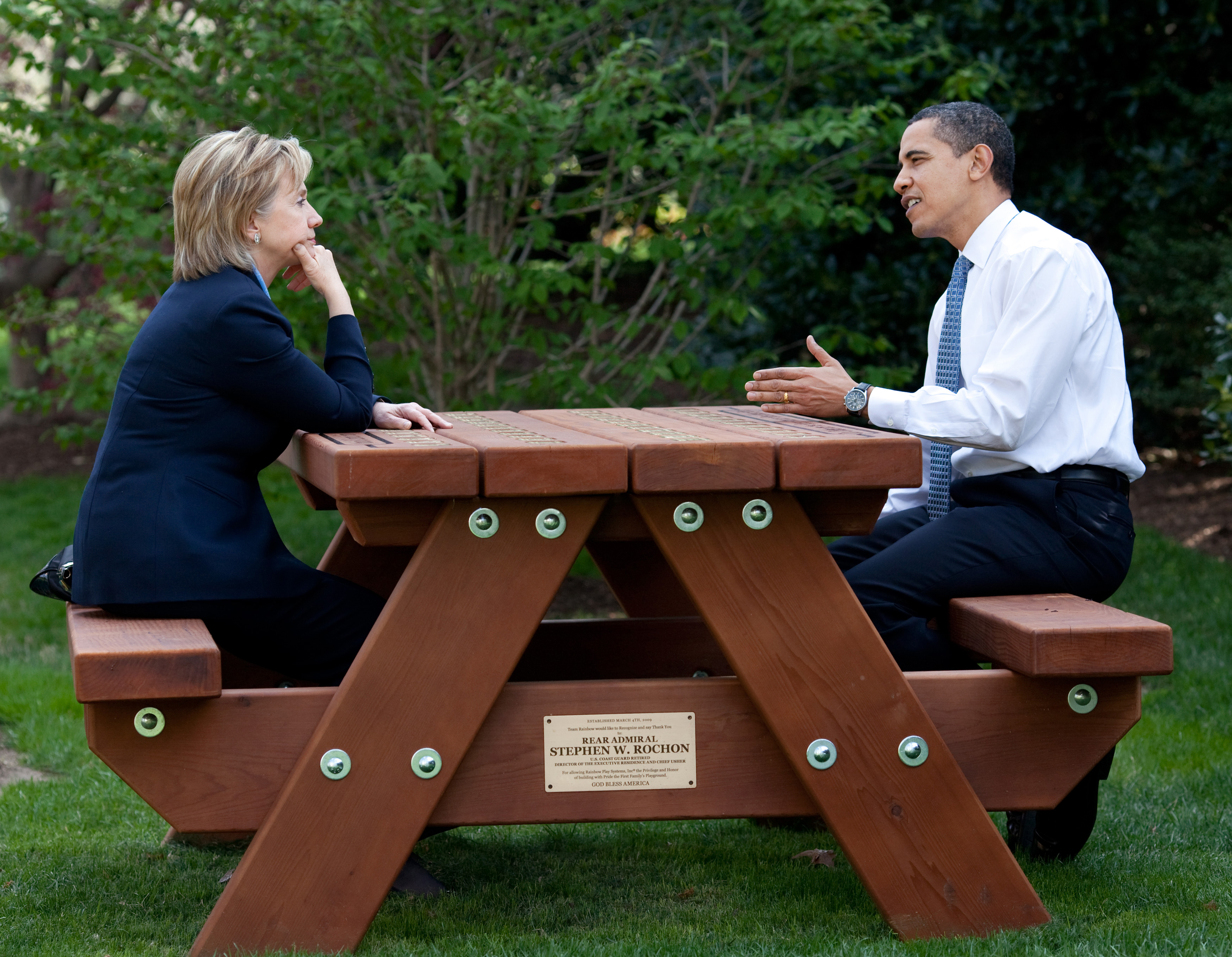
Former US president Barack Obama and secretary of state Hillary Clinton conversing at the Obama daughters' picnic table.

Picnic tables are used for dining, resting, crafts, and other activities. Picnic tables can be found outdoors in many public parks, residential back yards, rest areas, campgrounds, amusement parks, and many other places. Picnic tables are also used indoors when it is desired to have attached seating to tables.

=== Urban ===
In urbanized environments, picnic tables are often used as street furniture, and provide a convivial setting that can make it easier for neighborhood residents to interact with one another. In areas without adequate spaces, picnic tables placed on people's front yards have been used to similar effect. Picnic tables are also used to provide informal outdoor dining for food trucks and other small restaurants that lack indoor seating.

=== Outdoor ===
Picnic tables are widely used in outdoor learning because they provide a convenient combination of seating and a flat work surface. They have also shaped the outdoor educational profession in other ways: in 1983, at a meeting of the Association of Experiential Education, women educators met around a picnic table at midnight to discuss the problems facing women in the field of outdoor education. The picnic table dialogue subsequently spurred a broader conversation about and greater visibility to these issues.

The informal, outdoor character of picnic-table interactions has lent them to non-recreational uses as well. Israel and Jordan, while formally at war, held a series of secret talks between engineers regarding riparian issues at a picnic table at the confluence of the Yarmuk and Jordan rivers.

In 2009, a playset including a wooden A-frame picnic table engraved with the names of 44 US presidents was erected on the White House lawn for the president's daughters. Later in the same year, it was reported that the Beer Summit between President Obama, Henry Louis Gates, and a Cambridge police officer would be held at the picnic table; however, the meeting was actually held at a round white table in the Rose Garden. In 2017, after the incoming Trump administration declined the offer of the playset, it was donated to a local nonprofit.

A common use for picnic tables is outdoor activities, at campsites, scenic places, or common areas, though tables are not available everywhere.

Some aftermarket picnic tables can be attached to a pickup truck tailgate, for camping, fishing, hunting, sports, barbeque, tailgate party or as outdoor computer desk.

== Design ==
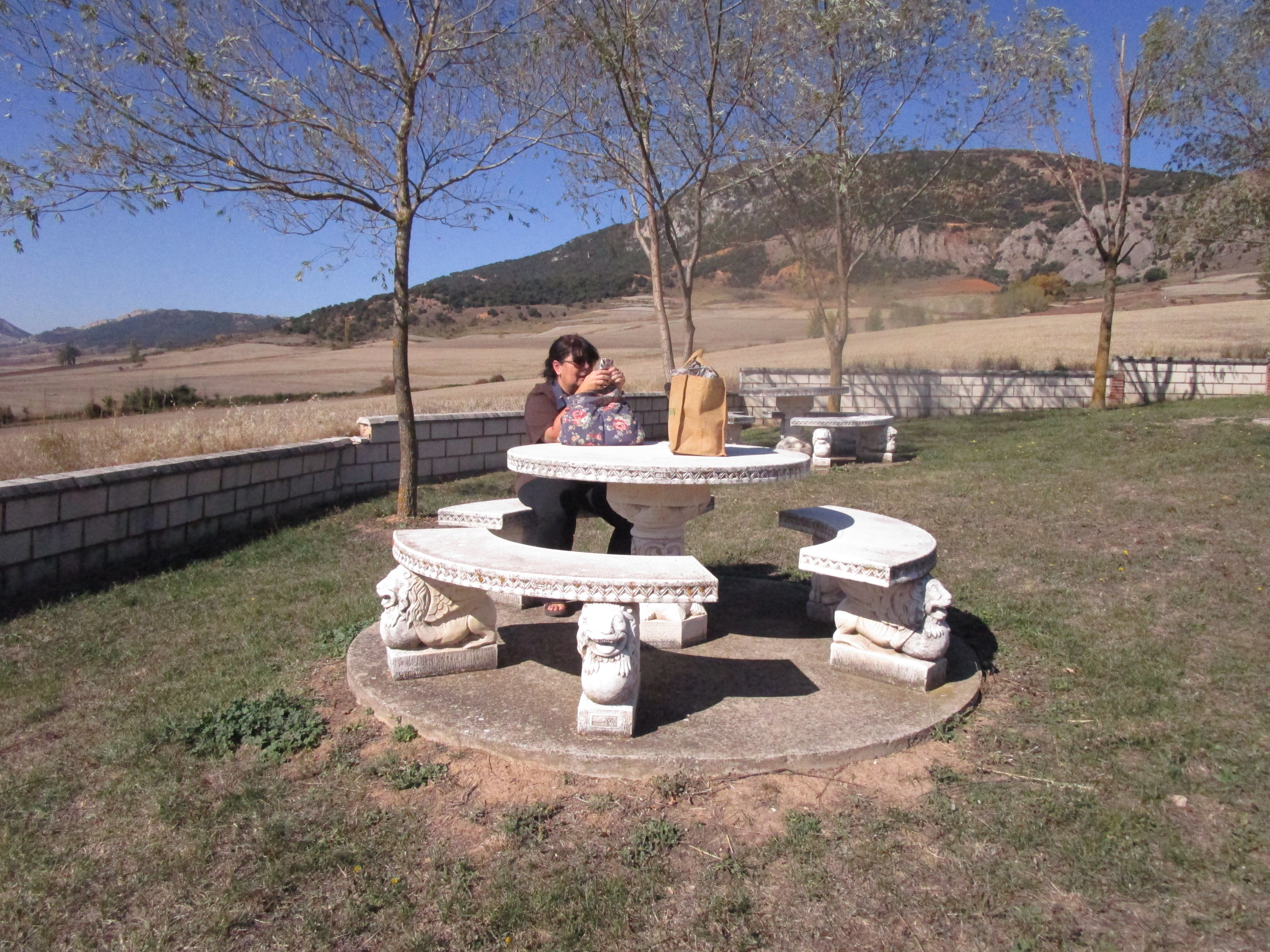
Circular picnic table in Spain.

=== Shape ===
The most traditional and common picnic table shape is rectangular, with a straight bench on each of the rectangle's two long edges. In the United States, this sort of rectangular picnic table is so closely associated with picnicking that it is the symbol used for picnic sites and picnic shelters under the Manual on Uniform Traffic Control Devices. However, many different shapes, including circular, hexagonal and octagonal designs, have also been used for picnic tables. Circular and octagonal picnic tables first became popular in California in the early 20th century because of their superior properties for playing card games.

=== Location ===
Most picnic tables are fixed or foldable structures, free standing or mounted to the floor, and are found at landmarks, scenic views or public places, for people to rest and gather. In contrast, a mobile picnic table does not have a particular spot or location, but follows around together with its platform and can be used for multiple purposes.

=== Size ===
A typical picnic table seats from six to eight people, though smaller and larger capacity tables exist. In particular, smaller picnic tables are often made for use by children. For rectangular picnic tables used in parks, the most common length is from 6–8 feet (1.8–2.4 metres).

== Materials ==
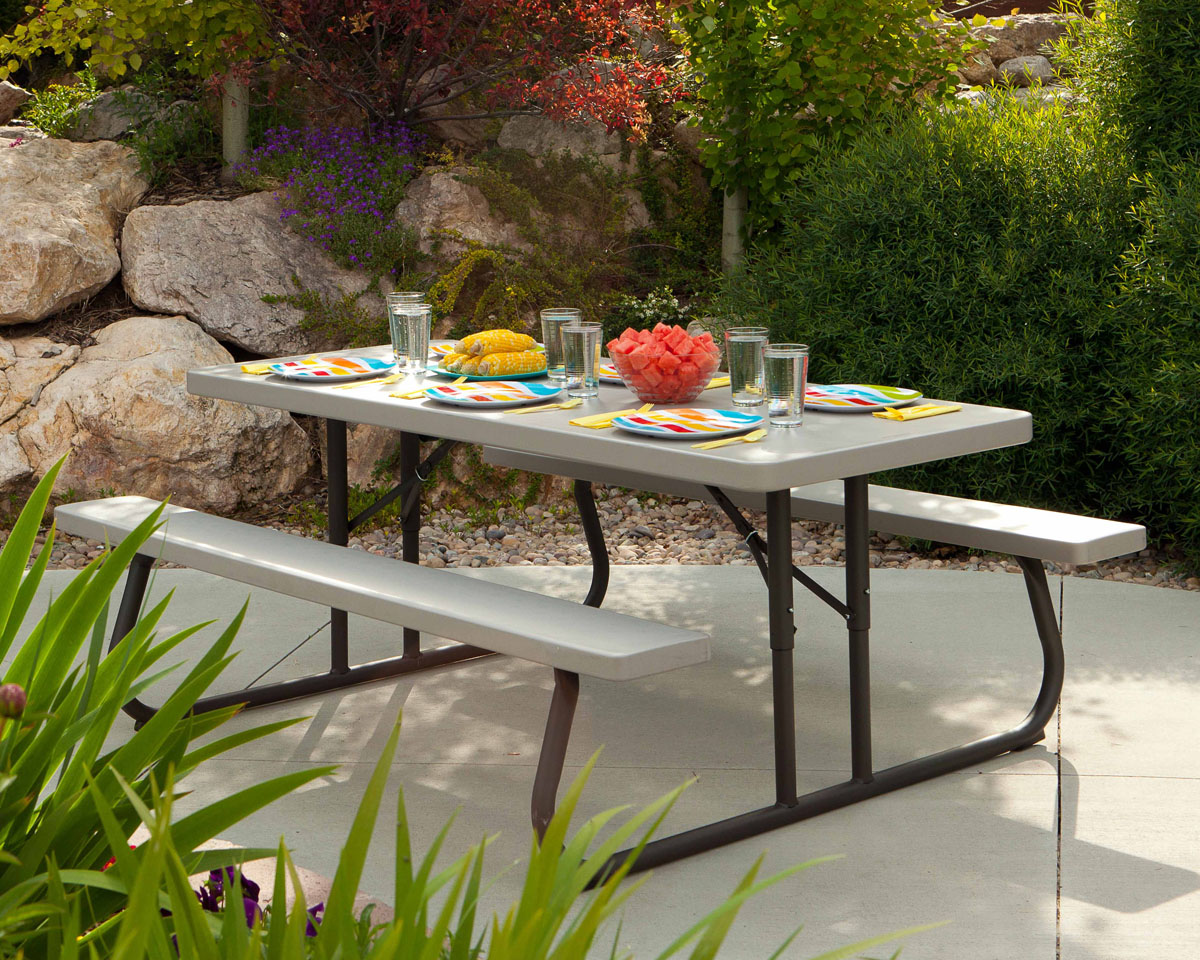
A metal and plastic picnic table.

The materials used for picnic tables have varied over time. A 1969 survey found that at that time, 95% of picnic tables contained wood to some extent, and 81% of picnic tables were made entirely of wood. Modern tables are increasingly often made from plastic, concrete, or metal. In addition, a combination of fiberglass and metal has sometimes been used.

=== Wood ===
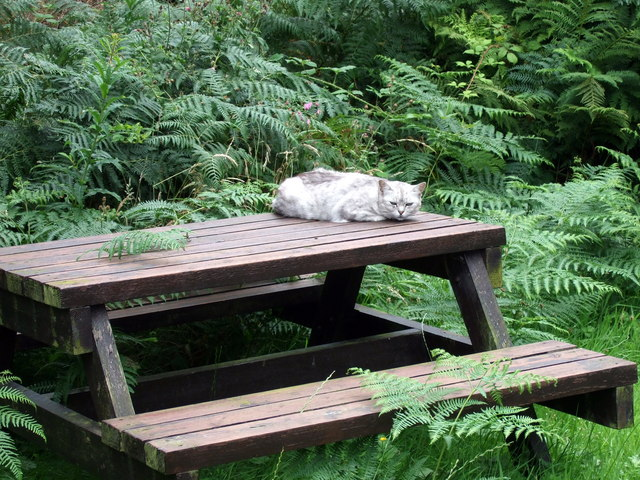
A cat atop a wooden picnic table

Wooden tables are most commonly constructed using lumber boards. Protection for the wood (stain, paint, or wood protectant that repels water) is necessary to protect it from cracking, warping, or rotting due to moisture. The table-top and bench-top boards are attached to the trusses or beams using wood screws or nails. The legs can be secured with carriage bolts fastened by nuts and washers.

In the context of public parks, there have traditionally been different schools of thought as to whether local or commercial timber should be used for picnic tables. In some cases, rough-hewn local timber was used for the structural supports and commercial boards were used for the benches and platform.

In California in the 1930s, cross-sections of redwood and fir trees were sometimes used for picnic tables, but these proved insufficiently durable.

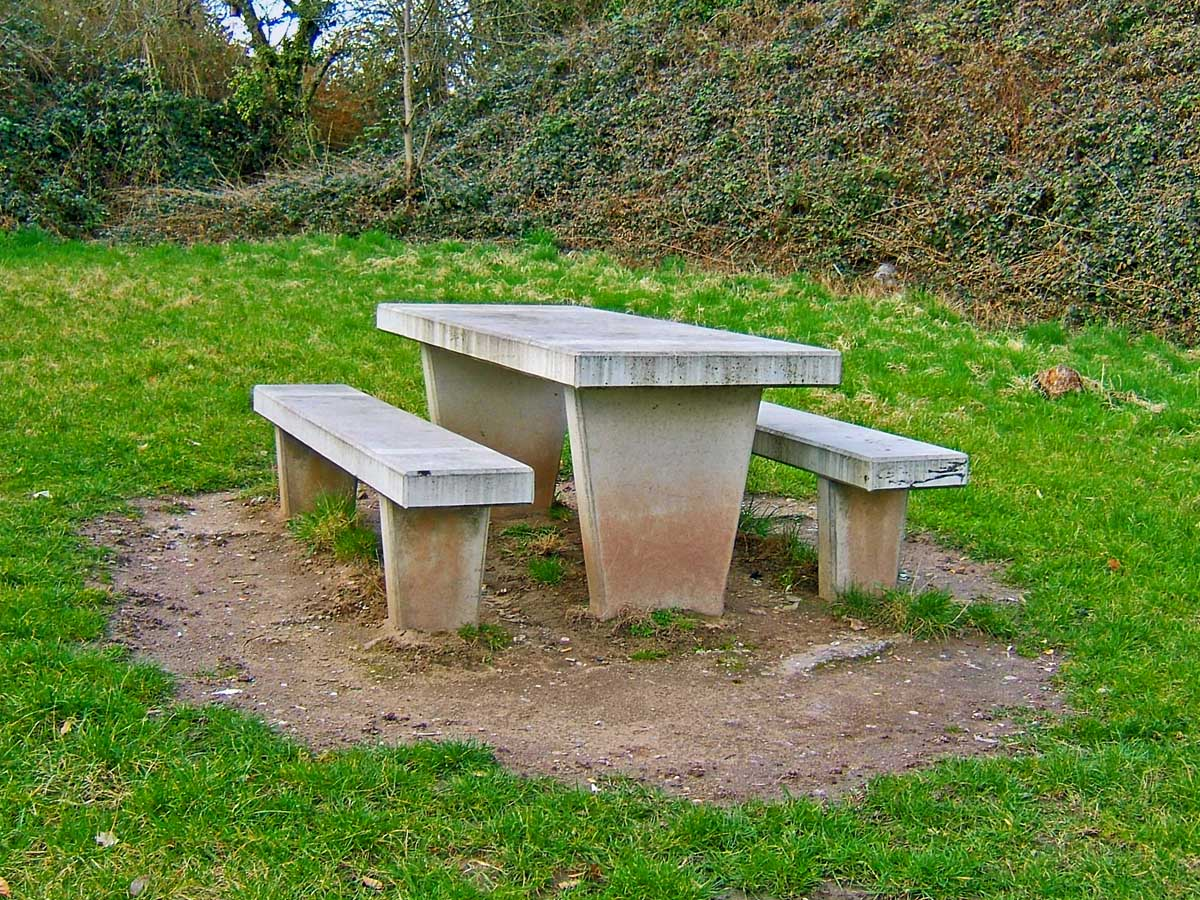
A concrete picnic table in Germany.

=== Stone or concrete ===
Stone or concrete picnic tables are durable but expensive. They are difficult or impossible to move, which may be a drawback in some contexts and an advantage in others. Such tables first came into widespread use in the United States in the 1930s, as part of Civilian Conservation Corps projects. However, stone tables proved unsatisfactory because they could not be moved even when the entire picnic site needed to be shifted from one location to another.

=== Plastic ===
Plastic picnic tables have grown in popularity because they are lighter, more durable, and less expensive than wooden tables, and require less maintenance. A common source for plastic "lumber" in picnic tables is recycled HDPE, which may be mixed with other materials such as wood flour for improved strength.

=== Metal ===
Metal picnic tables are becoming more popular in public parks because they are heavy and durable, and require little maintenance. Metal tables are sometimes attached onto concrete pads when theft is a concern. Thermoplastic-coated steel is often used for improved durability in outdoor applications. In addition, heavy-duty metal picnic tables are often used for indoor applications in prisons.

== Accessibility ==
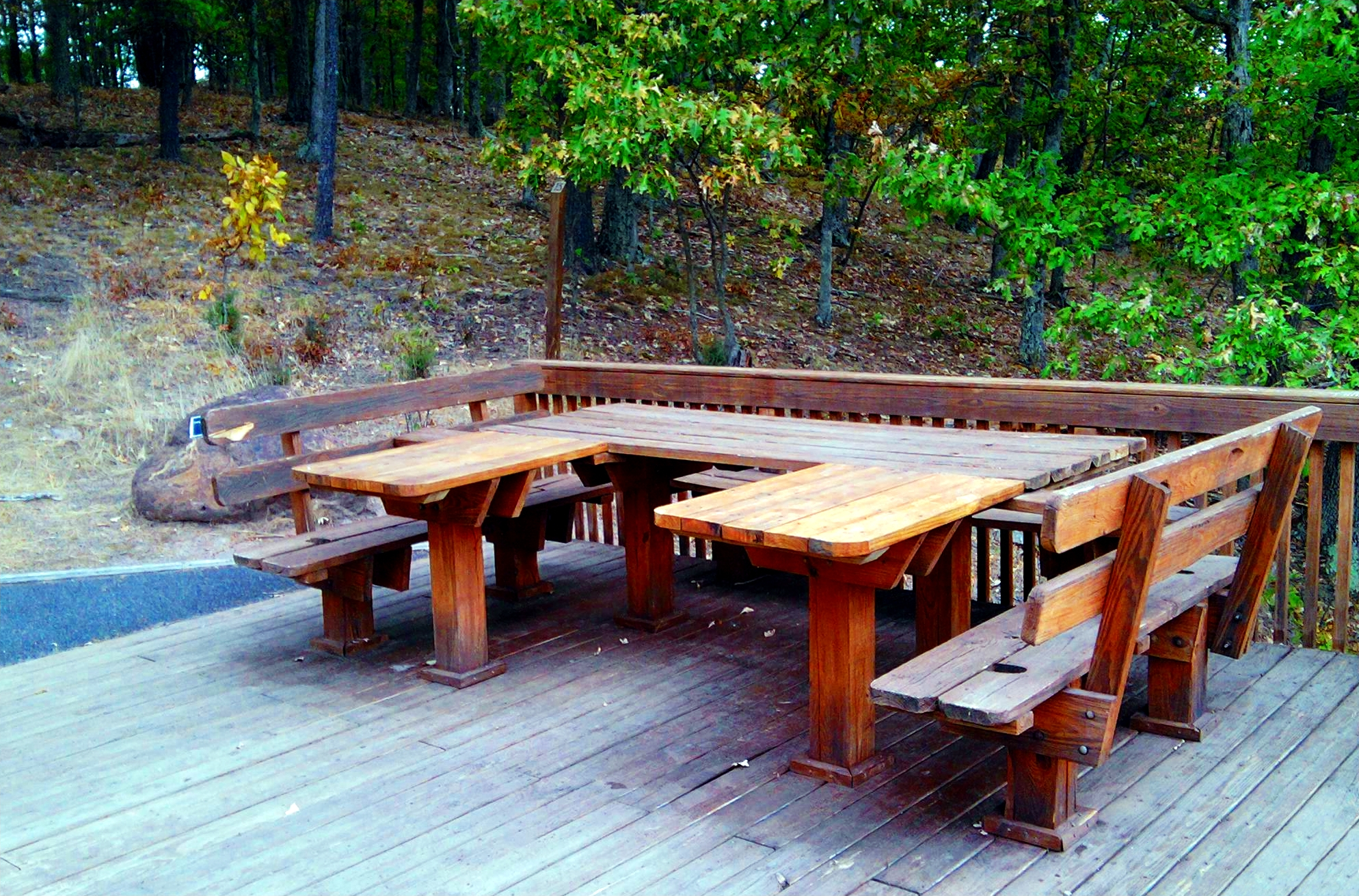
A wheelchair-accessible picnic table

Picnic tables pose a number of challenges for accessibility, particularly for users in wheelchairs.

In the United States, federal recreational facilities are required to provide picnic tables that are accessible for disabled users. At least 20% of picnic tables must be accessible, and if only one or two picnic tables are present, they must all be accessible. Under the Americans with Disabilities Act (ADA), at least 5% and no less than one of the tables that a business such as a restaurant provides must be disabled-accessible; this applies to picnic tables as well as other types of seating.

Nominally accessible picnic tables can still raise significant hurdles for disabled users. A common difficulty is soft or unstable ground around the picnic table that makes wheelchairs difficult to use. To address this problem, some US states mandate that picnic tables be placed on a concrete picnic pad.

=== Integration with other fixtures ===
Picnic tables are often integrated with other park fixtures, such as shelters and barbecue grills, which may all be attached to a single picnic pad. A bottle opener has sometimes been provided on the edge of the picnic table to dissuade picnickers from damaging the table top by opening bottles on it. Early US Forest Service picnic tables often integrated shelving and cupboards for user convenience, but these proved to be impossible to maintain and were not built after 1941.

Integrations with more modern technologies have also been developed: Sonoma State University has developed a solar charging station integrated with a picnic table, sun shade, and weather station, known as a "Smart Table".

== Problems ==
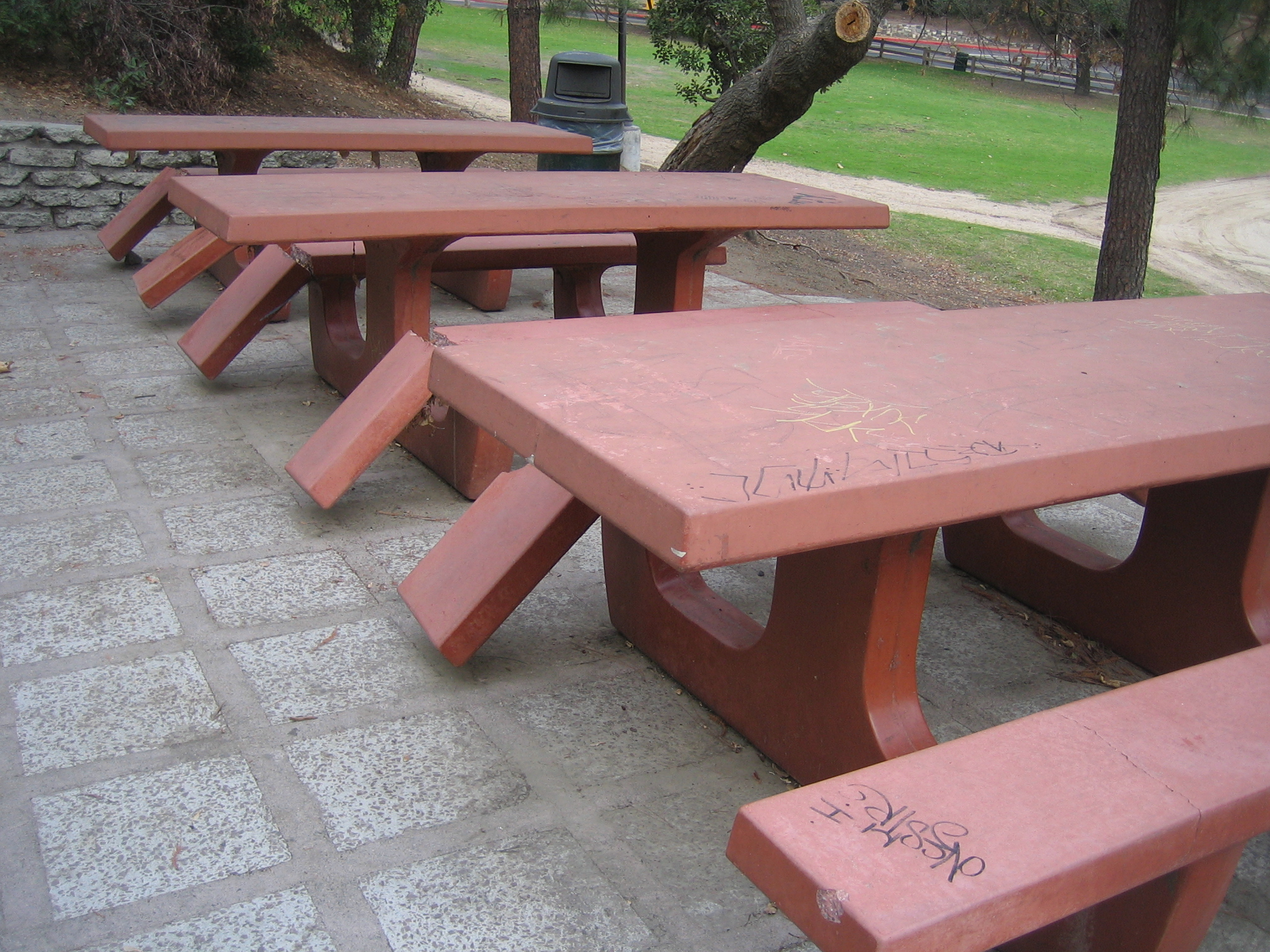
Vandalized picnic tables in a city park

Placing graffiti on picnic tables, either by carving or tagging, is a common form of recreational area vandalism. Studies in both the United States and Taiwan have found that picnic table vandalism is most likely to occur when the picnic table has already been vandalized. This phenomenon has been explained, using the framework of ecological psychology, as the pre-existing vandalism acting as a releasor cue for new vandals. Consequently, the operators of picnic facilities can best prevent vandalism by ensuring that any vandalism that occurs is addressed promptly. While graffiti is the most common type of vandalism, wooden picnic tables are also sometimes broken up by campers to be used as firewood.

Because flat wooden surfaces are vulnerable to decomposition in wet environments, picnic tables have historically often used wood treated with chromated copper arsenate (CCA). In one instance, a worker suffered extreme arsenic poisoning from sawing CCA-treated boards to construct a picnic table. In the United States, CCA-treated wood was in widespread use for outdoor applications from the 1940s until 2003, when an agreement between the Environmental Protection Agency and manufacturers of treated wood ended the chemical's use. Arsenic leaches continuously from CCA-treated wood for the entire service life of the picnic table, which may be up to 20 years.

== Environmental impacts ==
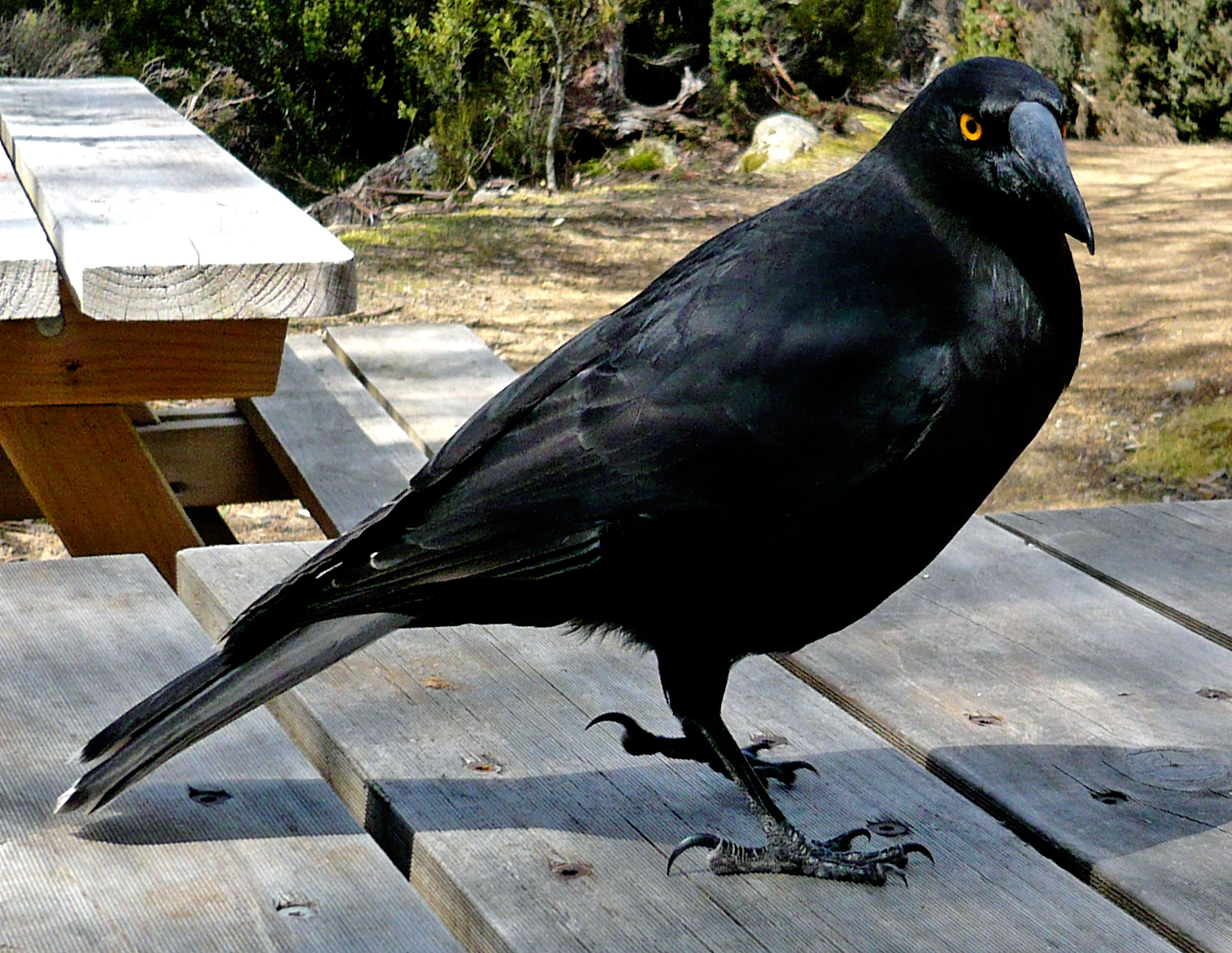
A Black Currawong on a picnic table in Tasmania

Picnic tables are a principal amenity affecting the quality of park users' recreational experience and their interest in using a particular park. This can have both positive and negative effects. There are often severe trampling effects on the ground immediately around a picnic table, but often these impacts are highly localized. However, in rainy areas the damage caused by trampling may in turn give rise to sheet erosion of the picnic site.

During picnic season, picnic tables are often a center of attention from non-human animals seeking access to either humans or their food. Nymphs of the Western black-legged tick, Ixodes pacificus, have been found on picnic tables at roughly the same frequency as in leaf litter. Hornets and other wasps may similarly nest under picnic table platforms or benches, which provide a sheltered location convenient to a food source.

As a source of food subsidy from humans, picnic tables have been found to affect corvid activity as these birds seek out areas near picnic tables and may refrain from scavenging deeper in the forest. Males of the Steller's jay in particular seek out territory near picnic tables because of the superior feeding opportunities.

A high-tech approach to picnic tables integrates re-used retired solar photovoltaic panels from solar farms as the table surface with recycled plastic lumber to reduce the overall environmental impact of the solar picnic table, while still encouraging people to use the outdoors and charge their devices. The plans for this table are open source hardware.

== Other approaches ==
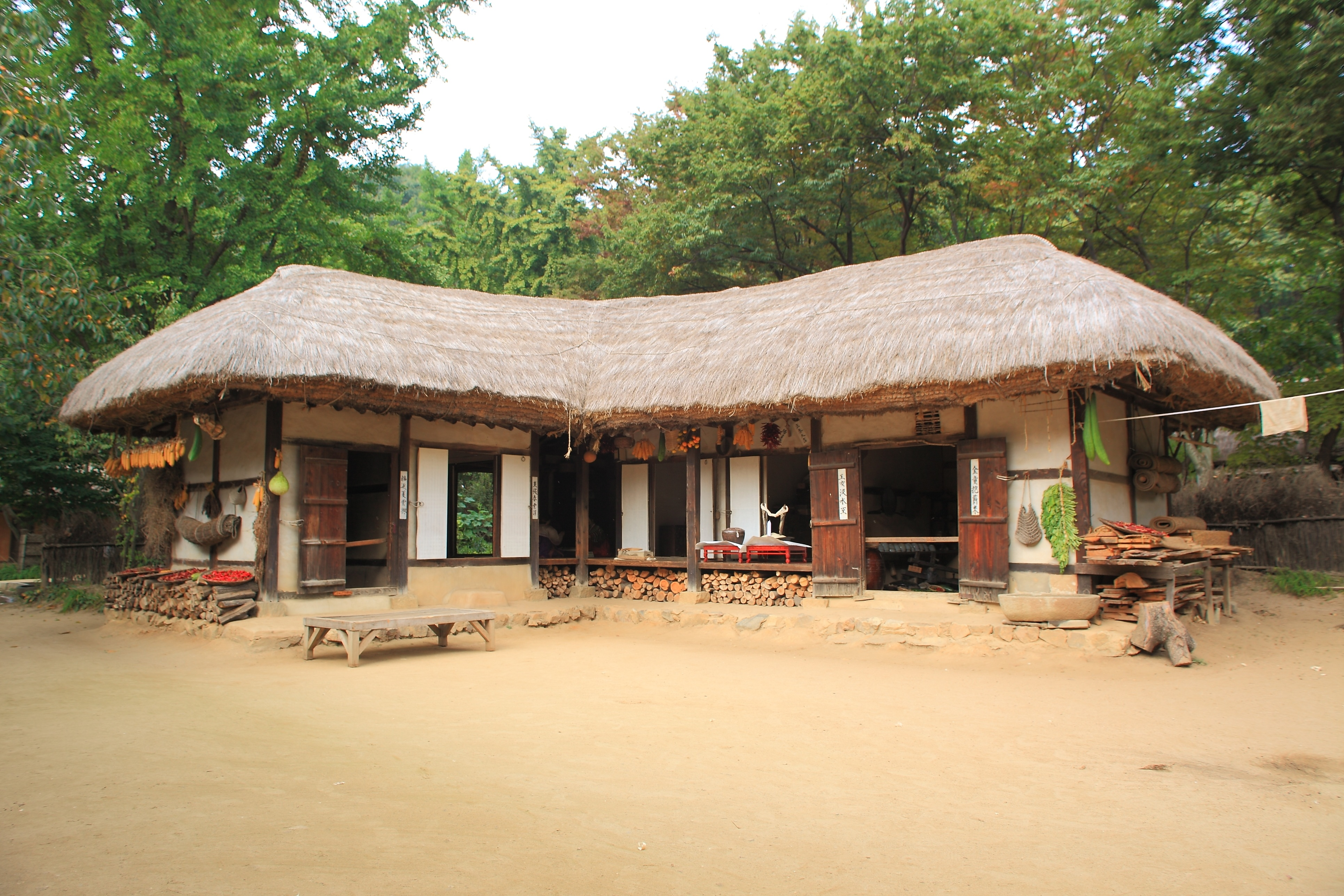
A historic Korean home with a pyeongsang in front.

Picnic tables are not the only specialized tables used for outdoor dining. For example, in Korea, where it is traditional to sit on the floor to dine, outdoor meals are often held on low wooden platforms known as pyeongsang, and diners sit directly on the platform rather than next to it. Sometimes referred to as "portable wooden decks", pyeongsang have a picnic-table-like ability to foster communal interaction when used as street furniture. In addition, in both Korea and Japan, picnic mats or sheets are sometimes used to create a comfortable, portable dining space.

== See also ==
- Patagonia picnic table effect

== Works cited ==
- Backman, Earl E. (1967). Recreation Facilities: A Personal History of Their Development in the National Forests of California, Volume 2. Forest Service, U.S. Department of Agriculture. OCLC 788561.
- Broda, Herbert W. (2007). Schoolyard-enhanced Learning: Using the Outdoors as an Instructional Tool, K-8. Stenhouse Publishers. ISBN 978-1-57110-729-9.
- Good, Albert H. (1938). "Picnic Tables". Park and Recreation Structures.
- Sesco, Jerry Anthony (1969). The Market for Wood Picnic Structures. North Central Forest Experiment Station, Forest Service, U.S. Department of Agriculture.
