= Sawhorse =

Structure for supporting lumber workpieces during sawing

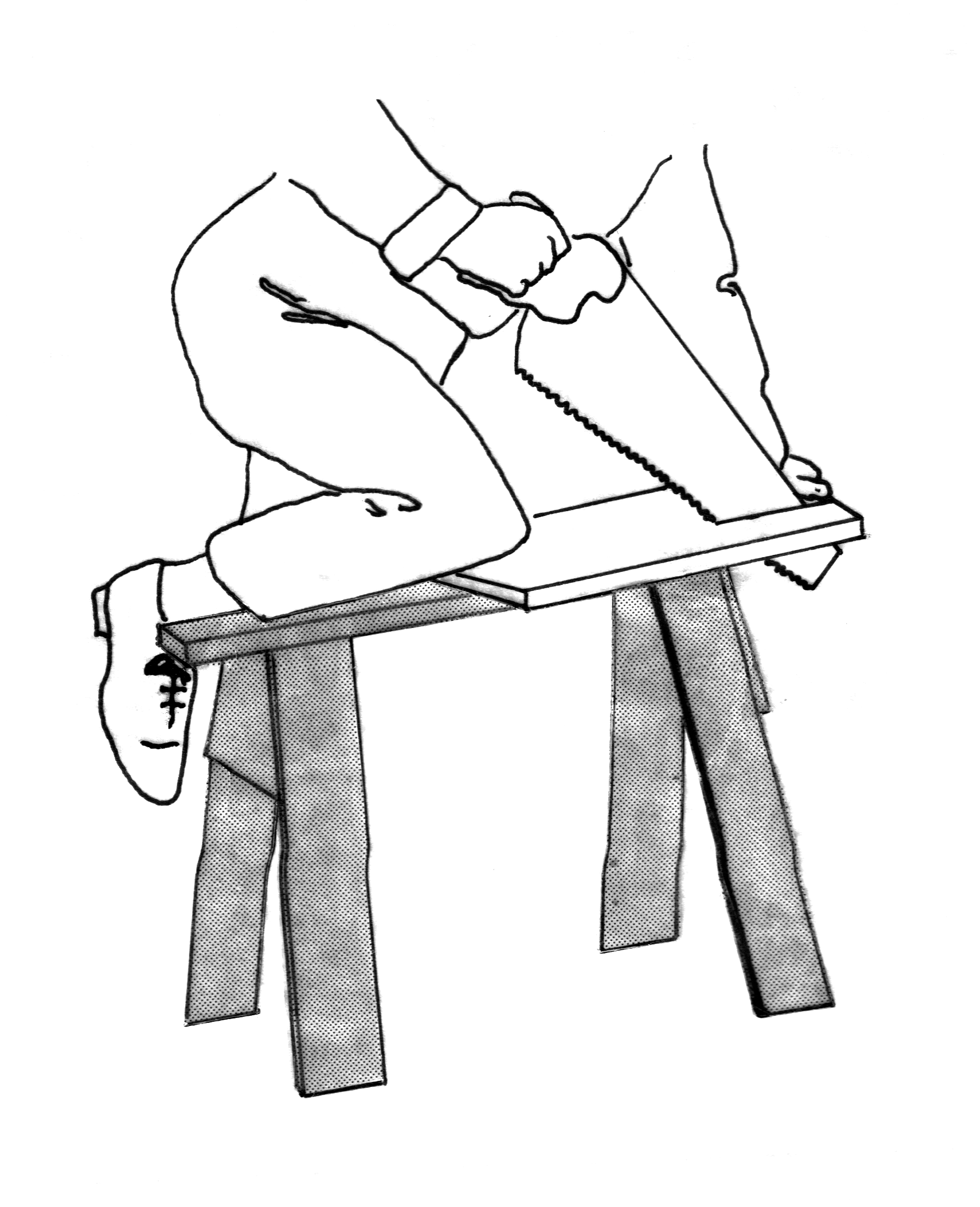
A sawhorse (gray shaded structure)

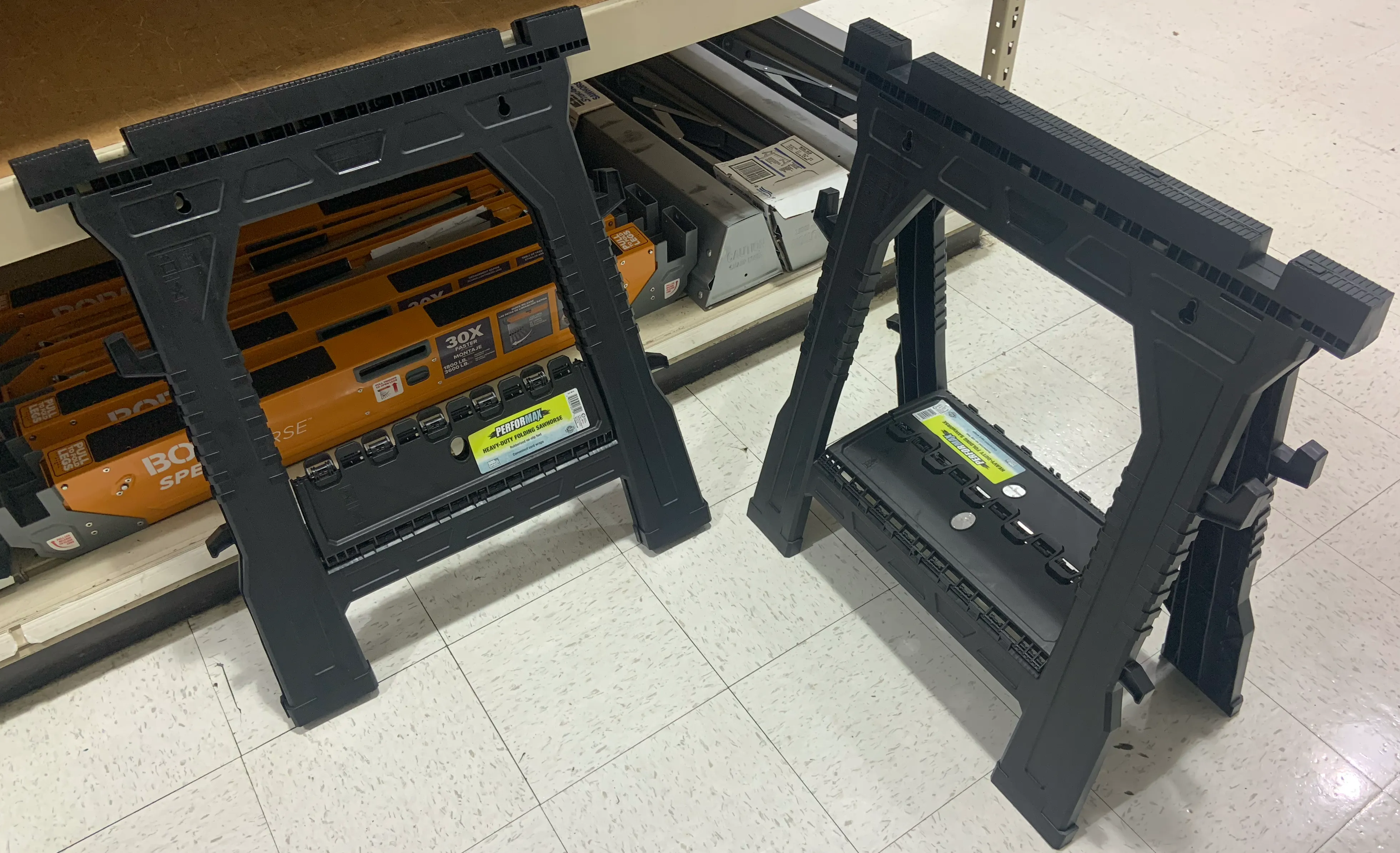
Plastic folding sawhorses

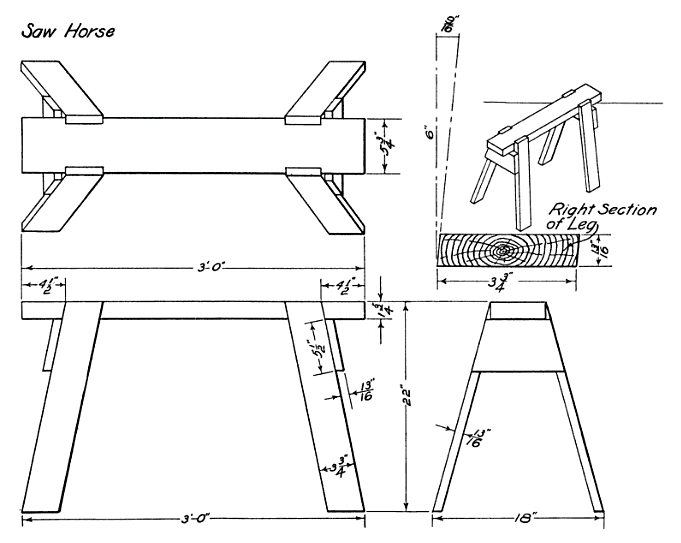
Lightweight, stack-able, saw horses from the book Agricultural Woodworking: a group of problems for rural and graded schools ... by Louis Michael Roehl (1916)

In woodworking, a saw-horse or sawhorse (saw-buck, trestle, buck) is a trestle structure used to support a board or plank for sawing. A pair of sawhorses can support a plank, forming a scaffold. In certain circles, it is also known as a mule and a short sawhorse is known as a pony. The names come from the shape of the frame, which resembles a horse. A sawhorse may also be a rack for supporting logs for sawing, known in the US as a sawbuck.

The sawhorse may be designed to fold for storage. A sawhorse with a wide top is particularly useful to support a board for sawing or as a field workbench, and is more useful as a single, but also more difficult to store.

A sawhorse can also be used as the base for a portable workbench by placing a sheet of plywood or even a door across two sawhorses. If the sawhorses are strong enough, the portable table can be used as a platform for tools like a table saw, although with caution if the top is not secured to the sawhorses.

In boatmaking, the curved nature of the cross-beam, designed to support the timbers used for hulls led to the colloquial name of sea-horse, this term, derived from old Norse, entered the Northumbrian dialect, it is thought, through Norwegian settlers as early as the 14th century.

== Related devices ==
- A sawbuck is the US term for a similar device for working with logs and branches. In the UK and Canada this is also called a sawhorse.
- Barricades fitted with flashing lights and used to block excavations or road construction or other safety-related purposes. Formerly made of wood, now many have metal structural members or are made wholly of plastic or composite.
  - The A-frame barricade or parade barricade resembles a sawhorse with a brightly painted top rail.
  - The Type I (or II) barricade also known as a waffle-board barricade resembles a sawhorse that can be folded flat. Type I indicates sheeting on top; Type II has sheeting on top and bottom.
  - The Type III barricade has multiple rails supported by two end posts with feet.

== History ==
Modern sawhorses are usually made of dimensional lumber, but the basic form of the sawhorse has remained unchanged for centuries. For example, one of the illustrations in De Re Metallica (1556) contains a drawing of a millwright using a pair of sawhorses to support the beams he is forming. The top of each of these sawhorses appears to be made from a halved log, with legs mortised or dovetailed into place.

== Crowd control ==
A device for crowd control in the 20th century had the shape of a sawhorse made of wood. The legs are similar but rather heavy duty facsimiles of the hobby version of about the same height. The horizontal bar consists of a heavy-duty plank about 4.3 m (14 feet) long with printed on it in large letters: Police Line - Do Not Cross. Many cities have chosen to replace this wooden barrier with the French barrier, which is a metal crowd control device.

== See also ==
- Trestle support
