= Two bits =

Two bits or two-bit may refer to:

- Quarter (United States coin), nicknamed "Two bits"

== People ==
- Mr. Two Bits (born 1922), football fan of the Florida Gators football team
- Two-Bits Homan (born 1898), Henry Homan, professional American football player in the 1920s
- Two Bits Man, author of the column "Two Bits" in The Technique, Georgia Institute of Technology, US

== Media ==
- Two Bits, a 1995 American film
- "Two bits", the response in the seven-note rhythm "Shave and a Haircut"
- Two-Bit Mathews, a character in the 1965 American novel The Outsiders by S.E. Hinton

== See also ==
- "Two-Bit Manchild", a 1968 song written and performed by Neil Diamond
- Two Bit Monsters, a 1980 album by American singer-songwriter John Hiatt
- Two Bits & Pepper, a 1995 American film unrelated to the above
- 2-bit (disambiguation)
