= Sawbuck =

Structure for holding wood workpieces to be sawed

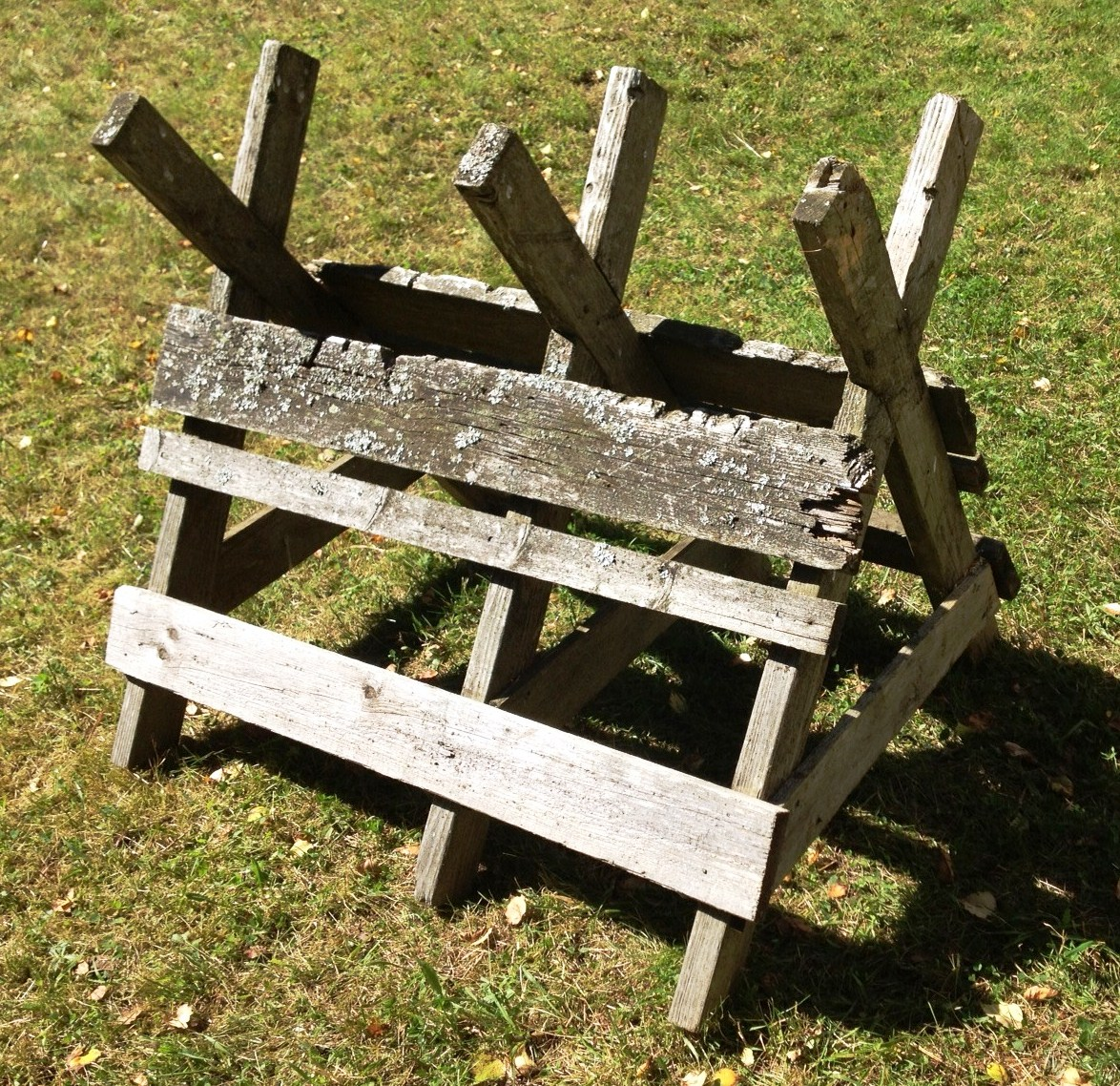

In woodworking, a sawbuck is a structure for holding wood so that it may be cut into pieces. Easily made in the field from rough material, it consists of an "X" form at each end which is joined by cross bars below the intersections of the X's. The wood to be cut is placed in the V's formed above the intersections of the X's.

In Canada, Britain, and the United States, a sawbuck is sometimes called a sawhorse or sawstool, although this term also refers to a similar device used (often in pairs) to support wood planks.

== United States ten-dollar bill ==
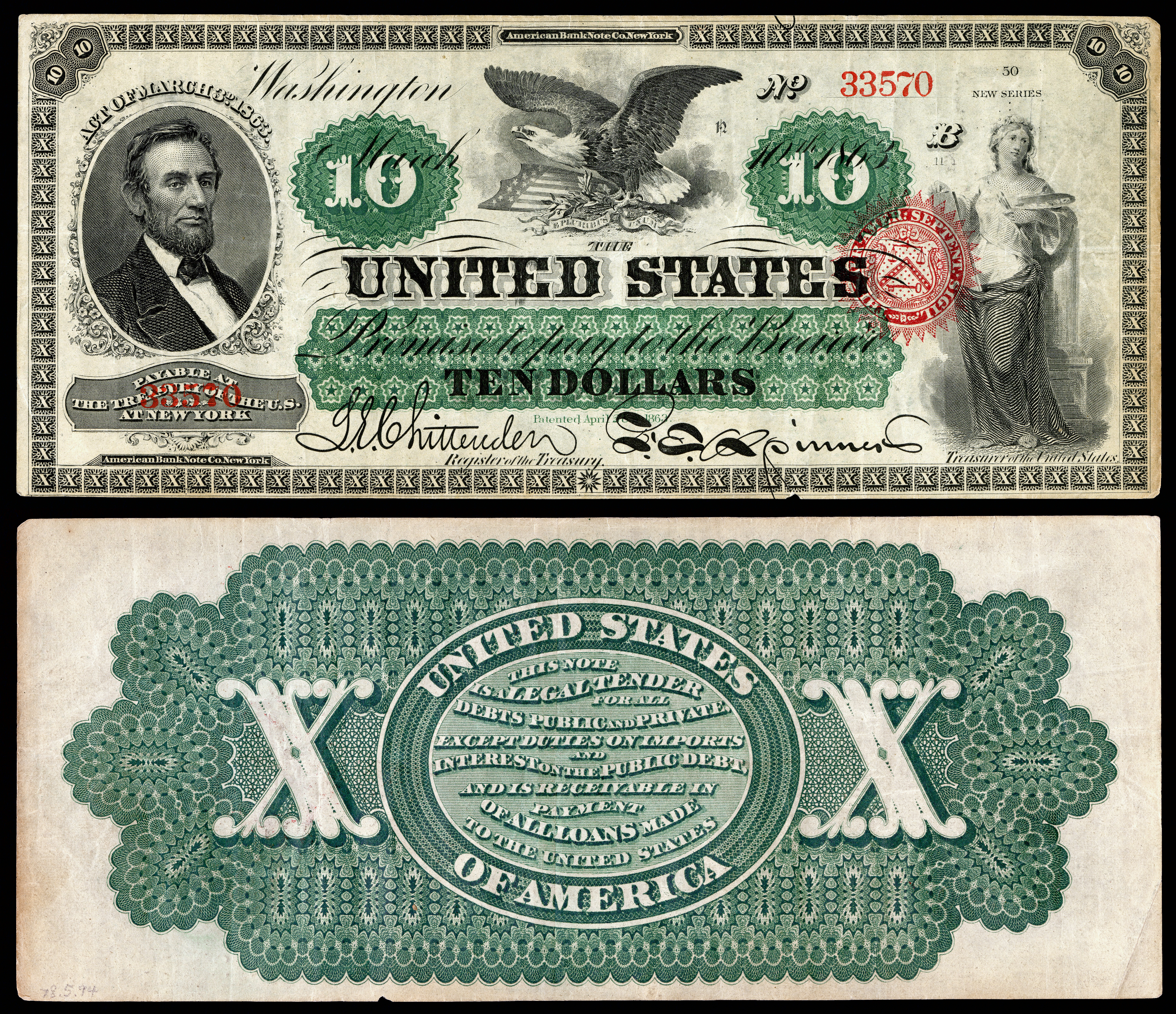
A U.S. ten-dollar bill from 1863

"Sawbuck" is also a slang term for a U.S. $10 bill, thought to be derived from the similarity between the shape of a sawbuck device and the Roman numeral X (10), which formerly appeared on $10 bills. However, there is some question whether this etymology is accurate, as the first known appearance of the word in print refers to the $10 bill, not to the device. A twenty-dollar bill is sometimes called a "double sawbuck.”

== See also ==
- Sawbuck table
