= Spondulix =

19th-century slang term

Spondulix is 19th-century slang for money or cash, more specifically a reasonable amount of spending money. Spondulicks, spondoolicks, spondulacks, spondulics, and spondoolics are alternative spellings, and spondoolies is a modern variant.

== Etymology ==
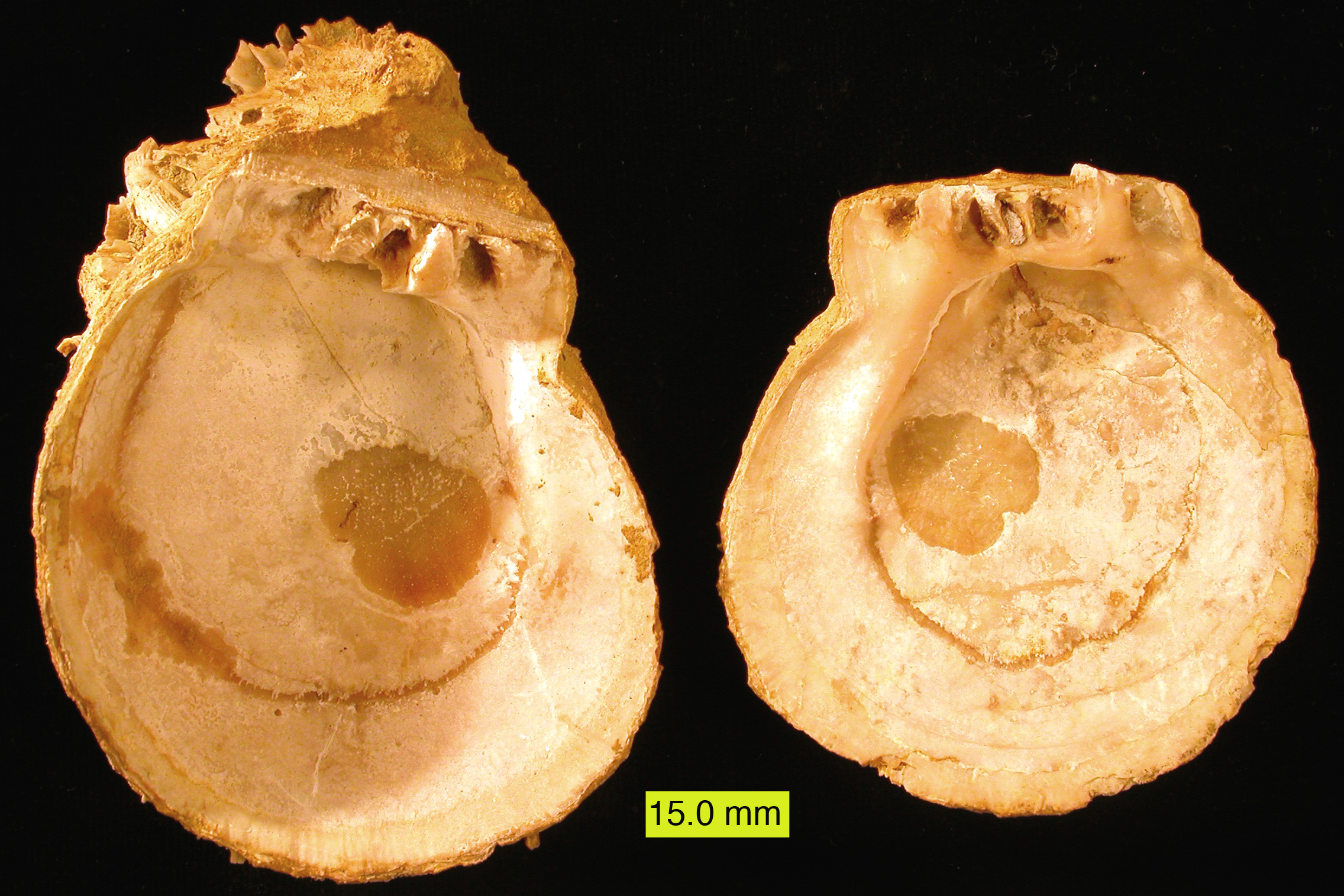
The interior of two fossil valves of Spondylus from the Pliocene of Cyprus

There are two views on the origin of the word.

=== Latin ===
Possibly derived from the Latin verb spondēre, meaning "to promise". Bank notes in England and elsewhere in the 19th century stated "I promise to pay the bearer ..." (the equivalent of the value of the note). Bank notes today continue with this promise.

=== Greek ===
Possibly derived from the Greek word spondulox, a type of seashell of the genus Spondylus.

The Spondylus shell was used as Neolithic jewellery and also as an early form of currency.

There is global evidence of the importance of the spondylus shell. Archaeological evidence shows that people in Europe were trading the shells as jewellery as long as 5,000 years ago. Spondylus shells from the Aegean Sea were harvested and then worked into bracelets, bangles and ornaments and transported throughout the continent. It is thought that the shells were also traded as an early form of currency due to their mother-of-pearl-like appearance. There may also be a connection with spondylo-, a prefix which means spine or vertebrae, based on the similarity between a stack of coins and a spine. This is referenced in an 1867 book by John Mitchell Bonnell and quotes etymologist Michael Quinion's correspondence with a Doug Wilson linking the spine to piled coins; thus "Spondulics - coin piled for counting...".

== Early written use ==
The earliest recorded occurrence of the word as slang for money appears to have been in the late 19th century in the United States. The New Oxford Dictionary of English marks the origin as US slang. However, according to the Cassell Dictionary of Slang, the term can be traced back to the mid-19th century in England. Other sources also suggest a mid-19th-century origin. The July 1852 edition of the Water-Cure Journal includes "Gossip from Indiana" by "a Hoosier" which complains about "spending our spondulix." In Meister Karl's Sketch-Book (1855), Charles Godfrey Leland includes it in a long list of synonyms for money: "... the magic spell of the ready—otherwise known as money, cash, tin, stuff, rhino, root-of-all-evil, blunt, wherewithal, rowdy, funds, stumpy, pecuniary, dibs, hard, browns, heavy, mopusses, slugs, shiners, lucre, or 'the filthy,' dust, gelt, chips, lumps, chinkers, mint-drops, pewter, brass, horsenails, rocks, brads, spondulix, needful, dough, spoons, buttons, dimes, or the infallible ..." The spelling "spondulicks" appeared in an 1858 edition of Hutchings' Illustrated California Magazine: "Steve, if the Court recollects herself, then you come up with the spondulicks, and Bill Bresse tuck down Lem's pile." Louisa May Alcott's Eight Cousins (1875) has a variant spelling in Charlie's statement that, "we have plenty of 'spondulics,' so we can rather lord it over the other fellows and do as we like."

"Spondulix" is used by 19th-century American author Bret Harte in his 1891 story "A Sappho of Green Springs": "MR. EDITOR, – I see you have got my poetry in. But I don't see the spondulix that oughter follow."; in Chapter XIII of The Adventures of Huckleberry Finn, the riverboat captain tells Huck that he wouldn't forsake a sailor's life "for all [old Jim Hornback's] spondulicks and as much more..." It is also mentioned in the short story "Ivy Day in the Committee Room" from the collection Dubliners (1914) by Irish novelist James Joyce. In the 1916 Charlie Chaplin silent film The Floorwalker, a title card proclaims "Spondulicks Forever!" after Chaplin appears to rejoice upon recovering a suitcase full of greenbacks.
