= List of countries by exchange rate regime =

This is a list of countries and territories by their exchange rate regime.

De facto exchange-rate arrangements in 2023 as classified by the International Monetary Fund. Floating (floating and free floating) Soft pegs (conventional peg, stabilized arrangement, crawling peg, crawl-like arrangement, pegged exchange rate within horizontal bands) Hard pegs (no separate legal tender, currency board) Residual (other managed arrangement)

== Table of Monetary Policy framework ==
De Facto Classification of Exchange Rate Arrangements and Monetary Policy Frameworks (2023)
Exchange rate arrangement (Number of countries and territories)	Exchange rate anchor				Monetary aggregate target (26)	Inflation Targeting framework (45)	Others (42)
Exchange rate arrangement (Number of countries and territories)	US Dollar (38)	Euro (25 + 5)	Composite (8)	Other (10 + 1)	Monetary aggregate target (26)	Inflation Targeting framework (45)	Others (42)
No separate legal tender (14 + 3)	Ecuador; El Salvador; Marshall Islands; Micronesia; Palau; Panama (PAB); Timor-Leste	Andorra; Kosovo; Monaco; Montenegro; San Marino; Vatican City		Kiribati; Liechtenstein; Nauru; Tuvalu			
Currency board (12)	Djibouti (DJF); Hong Kong (HKD); ECCU: Antigua and Barbuda (XCD); Dominica (XCD); Grenada (XCD); Saint Kitts and Nevis (XCD); Saint Lucia (XCD); Saint Vincent and the Grenadines (XCD)	Bosnia and Herzegovina (BAM); Bulgaria (BGN) (Note: The bulgarian lev was replaced by the euro on 1 January 2026)		Brunei (BND); Macau (MOP)			
Conventional peg (40 + 3)	Aruba (AWG); The Bahamas (BSD); Bahrain (BHD); Barbados (BBD); Belize (BZD); Curaçao & Sint Maarten (XCG); Eritrea (ERN); Iraq (IQD); Jordan (JOD); Oman (OMR); Qatar (QAR); Saudi Arabia (SAR); Turkmenistan (TMT); United Arab Emirates (AED)	Cape Verde (CVE); Comoros (KMF); Denmark (DKK); São Tomé and Príncipe (STD); WAEMU: Benin (XOF); Burkina Faso (XOF); Guinea-Bissau (XOF); Ivory Coast (XOF); Mali (XOF); Niger (XOF); Senegal (XOF); Togo (XOF); CEMAC: Cameroon (XAF); Central African Republic (XAF); Chad (XAF); Equatorial Guinea (XAF); Gabon (XAF); Republic of the Congo (XAF); CFP franc zone: French Polynesia (XPF); New Caledonia (XPF); Wallis and Futuna (XPF)	Fiji (FJD); Libya (LYD)	Bhutan (BTN); Eswatini (SZL); Lesotho (LSL); Namibia (NAD); Nepal (NPR)	Samoa (SAT)		
Stabilized arrangement (22)	Guyana (GYD); Honduras (HNL); Lebanon (LBP); Maldives (MVR); Trinidad and Tobago (TTD); Ukraine (UAH)	North Macedonia (MKD)	Vietnam (VND)		Bolivia (BOB); Guinea (GNF); Myanmar (MMK); Papua New Guinea (PGK); Tajikistan (TJS); Tanzania (TZS)	Armenia (AMD); Guatemala (GTQ); Romania (RON); Serbia (RSD)	Azerbaijan (AZN); Malawi (MWK); Mozambique (MZN); Sudan (SDG)
Crawling peg (3)	Nicaragua (NIO)		Botswana (BWP)				Argentina (ARS)
Crawl-like arrangement (24)	Cambodia (KHR)		Singapore (SGD)		Afghanistan (AFN); Algeria (DZD); Burundi (BIF); Democratic Republic of the Congo (CDF); Ethiopia (ETB); The Gambia (GMD); Nigeria (NGN); Rwanda (RWF)	Jamaica (JMD); Kenya (KES); Mongolia (MNT); Sri Lanka (LKR); Turkey (TRY); Uzbekistan (UZS)	Egypt (EGP); Kyrgyzstan (KGS); Mauritania (MRO); Tunisia (TND); Zambia (ZMW)
Pegged exchange rate within horizontal bands (1)			Morocco (MAD)				
Other managed arrangement (12)	Iran (IRR)		Kuwait (KWD); Syria (SYP)		Angola (AOA); Bangladesh (BDT); China (CNY); Sierra Leone (SLL); Zimbabwe (ZWL)	Dominican Republic (DOP); Ghana (GHS)	Haiti (HTG); Laos (LAK); Pakistan (PKR); Solomon Islands (SBD); South Sudan (SSP); Tonga (TOP); Vanuatu (VUV); Venezuela (VED)
Floating (32)					Belarus (BYR); Liberia (LRD); Madagascar (MGA); Seychelles (SCR); Suriname (SRD); Yemen (YER)	Albania (ALL); Brazil (BRL); Chile (CLP); Colombia (COP); Costa Rica (CRC); Czech Republic (CZK); Georgia (GEL); Hungary (HUF); Iceland (ISK); India (INR); Indonesia (IDR); Israel (ILS); Kazakhstan (KZT); Mauritius (MUR); Moldova (MDL); New Zealand (NZD); Paraguay (PYG); Peru (PEN); Philippines (PHP); South Africa (ZAR); South Korea (KRW); Thailand (THB); Uganda (UGX); Uruguay (UYU)	Malaysia (MYR); Switzerland (CHF)
Free floating (33)						Australia (AUD); Canada (CAD); Japan (JPY); Mexico (MXN); Norway (NOK); Poland (PLN); Russia (RUB); Sweden (SEK); United Kingdom (GBP)	European Union (EUR) (Note: On 1 January 2026, Bulgaria joined the eurozone); Austria; Belgium; Croatia; Cyprus; Estonia; Finland; France; Germany; Greece; Ireland; Italy; Latvia; Lithuania; Luxembourg; Malta; Netherlands; Portugal; Slovakia; Slovenia; Spain; Somalia (SOS); United States (USD)

== No legal tender of their own ==
=== US dollar as legal tender ===
- British Virgin Islands
- Caribbean Netherlands
- Ecuador
- El Salvador
- Marshall Islands
- Micronesia
- Palau
- Panama (PAB)
- Timor-Leste
- Turks and Caicos Islands

=== Euro as legal tender ===
- Andorra
- Kosovo
- Monaco
- Montenegro
- San Marino
- Vatican City

=== Australian dollar as legal tender ===
- Kiribati
- Nauru
- Tuvalu

=== Swiss franc as legal tender ===
- Liechtenstein

== Currency board ==
=== US dollar as exchange rate anchor ===
- Antigua and Barbuda (XCD)
- Djibouti (DJF)
- Dominica (XCD)
- Grenada (XCD)
- Hong Kong (HKD)
- Saint Kitts and Nevis (XCD)
- Saint Lucia (XCD)
- Saint Vincent and the Grenadines (XCD)

=== Euro as exchange rate anchor ===
- Bosnia and Herzegovina (BAM)
- Bulgaria (BGN)

=== Singapore dollar as exchange rate anchor ===
- Brunei (BND)

=== Hong Kong dollar as exchange rate anchor ===
- Macau (MOP)

== Conventional peg ==
=== US dollar as exchange rate anchor ===
- Aruba (AWG)
- The Bahamas (BSD)
- Bahrain (BHD)
- Barbados (BBD)
- Belize (BZD)
- Bermuda (BMD)
- Curaçao & Sint Maarten (XCG)
- Eritrea (ERN)
- Iraq (IQD)
- Jordan (JOD)
- Oman (OMR)
- Qatar (QAR)
- Saudi Arabia (SAR)
- Turkmenistan (TMT)
- United Arab Emirates (AED)

=== Euro as exchange rate anchor ===
- Benin (XOF)
- Burkina Faso (XOF)
- Cameroon (XAF)
- Cape Verde (CVE)
- Central African Republic (XAF)
- Chad (XAF)
- Comoros (KMF)
- Denmark (DKK)
- Equatorial Guinea (XAF)
- French Polynesia (XPF)
- Gabon (XAF)
- Guinea-Bissau (XOF)
- Ivory Coast (XOF)
- Mali (XOF)
- New Caledonia (XPF)
- Niger (XOF)
- Republic of the Congo (XAF)
- São Tomé and Príncipe (STD)
- Senegal (XOF)
- Togo (XOF)
- Wallis and Futuna (XPF)

=== Composite exchange rate anchor ===
- Fiji (FJD)
- Libya (LYD)

=== Rand as exchange rate anchor ===
- Eswatini (SZL)
- Lesotho (LSL)
- Namibia (NAD)

=== Indian Rupee as exchange rate anchor ===
- Bhutan (BTN)
- Nepal (NPR)

=== Monetary aggregate target ===
- Samoa (SAT)

== Stabilized arrangement ==
=== US dollar as exchange rate anchor ===
- Guyana (GYD)
- Honduras (HNL)
- Lebanon (LBP)
- Maldives (MVR)
- Trinidad and Tobago (TTD)
- Ukraine (UAH)

=== Euro as exchange rate anchor ===
- North Macedonia (MKD)

=== Composite exchange rate anchor ===
- Vietnam (VND)

=== Monetary aggregate target ===
- Bolivia (BOB)
- Guinea (GNF)
- Myanmar (MMK)
- Papua New Guinea (PGK)
- Tajikistan (TJS)
- Tanzania (TZS)

=== Inflation-targeting framework ===
- Armenia (AMD)
- Guatemala (GTQ)
- Romania (RON)
- Serbia (RSD)

=== Other ===
- Azerbaijan (AZN)
- Malawi (MWK)
- Mozambique (MZN)
- Sudan (SDG)

== Crawling peg ==
=== US dollar as exchange rate anchor ===
- Nicaragua (NIO)

=== Composite exchange rate anchor ===
- Botswana (BWP)

=== Other ===
- Argentina (ARS)

== Crawl-like arrangement ==
=== US dollar as exchange rate anchor ===
- Cambodia (KHR)

=== Composite exchange rate anchor ===
- Singapore (SGD)

=== Monetary aggregate target ===
- Afghanistan (AFN)
- Algeria (DZD)
- Burundi (BIF)
- Democratic Republic of the Congo (CDF)
- Ethiopia (ETB)
- The Gambia (GMD)
- Nigeria (NGN)
- Rwanda (RWF)

=== Inflation-targeting framework ===
- Jamaica (JMD)
- Kenya (KES)
- Mongolia (MNT)
- Sri Lanka (LKR)
- Turkey (TRY)
- Uzbekistan (UZS)

=== Other ===
- Egypt (EGP)
- Kyrgyzstan (KGS)
- Mauritania (MRO)
- Tunisia (TND)
- Zambia (ZMW)

== Pegged exchange rate within horizontal bands ==
=== Composite exchange rate anchor ===
- Morocco (MAD)

== Other managed arrangement ==
=== US dollar as exchange rate anchor ===
- Iran (IRR)

=== Composite exchange rate anchor ===
- Kuwait (KWD)
- Syria (SYP)

=== Monetary aggregate target ===
- Angola (AOA)
- Bangladesh (BDT)
- China (CNY)
- Sierra Leone (SLL)
- Zimbabwe (ZWL)

=== Inflation-targeting framework ===
- Dominican Republic (DOP)
- Ghana (GHS)

=== Other ===
- Haiti (HTG)
- Laos (LAK)
- Pakistan (PKR)
- Solomon Islands (SBD)
- South Sudan (SSP)
- Tonga (TOP)
- Vanuatu (VUV)
- Venezuela (VED)

== Floating ==
=== Monetary aggregate target ===
- Belarus (BYR)
- Liberia (LRD)
- Madagascar (MGA)
- Seychelles (SCR)
- Suriname (SRD)
- Yemen (YER)

=== Inflation-targeting framework ===
- Albania (ALL)
- Brazil (BRL)
- Chile (CLP)
- Colombia (COP)
- Costa Rica (CRC)
- Czech Republic (CZK)
- Georgia (GEL)
- Hungary (HUF)
- Iceland (ISK)
- India (INR)
- Indonesia (IDR)
- Israel (ILS)
- Kazakhstan (KZT)
- Mauritius (MUR)
- Moldova (MDL)
- New Zealand (NZD)
- Paraguay (PYG)
- Peru (PEN)
- Philippines (PHP)
- South Africa (ZAR)
- South Korea (KRW)
- Thailand (THB)
- Uganda (UGX)
- Uruguay (UYU)

=== Other ===
- Malaysia (MYR)
- Switzerland (CHF)

== Free floating ==
=== Inflation-targeting framework ===
- Australia (AUD)
- Canada (CAD)
- Japan (JPY)
- Mexico (MXN)
- Norway (NOK)
- Poland (PLN)
- Russia (RUB)
- Sweden (SEK)
- United Kingdom (GBP)

=== Other ===
- European Union (EUR)
  - Austria
  - Belgium
  - Croatia
  - Cyprus
  - Estonia
  - Finland
  - France
  - Germany
  - Greece
  - Ireland
  - Italy
  - Latvia
  - Lithuania
  - Luxembourg
  - Malta
  - Netherlands
  - Portugal
  - Slovakia
  - Slovenia
  - Spain
- Somalia (SOS)
- United States (USD)

== See also ==
- Reserve currency
- Managed float regime
