= Exchange-rate flexibility =

Monetary system where exchange rates determined by supply and demand

In macroeconomics, a flexible exchange-rate system is a monetary system that allows the exchange rate to be determined by supply and demand.

Every currency area must decide what type of exchange rate arrangement to maintain. Between permanently fixed and completely flexible, some take heterogeneous approaches. They have different implications for the extent to which national authorities participate in foreign exchange markets. According to their degree of flexibility, post-Bretton Woods-exchange rate regimes are arranged into three categories:

- Fixed-rate regime: currency unions, dollarized regimes, currency boards and conventional currency pegs
- Intermediate regimes: horizontal bands, crawling pegs and crawling bands
- Flexible regimes: managed and independent floats

All monetary regimes except for the permanently fixed regime experience the time inconsistency problem and exchange rate volatility, albeit to different degrees.

== Fixed rate programs ==
In a fixed exchange rate system, the monetary authority picks rates of exchange with each other currency and commits to adjusting the money supply, restricting exchange transactions and adjusting other variables to ensure that the exchange rates do not move. All variations on fixed rates reduce the time inconsistency problem and reduce exchange rate volatility, albeit to different degrees.

Under dollarization/Euroization, the US dollar or the Euro acts as legal tender in a different country. Dollarization is a summary description of the use of foreign currency in its capacity to produce all types of money services in the domestic economy. Monetary policy is delegated to the anchor country. Under dollarization exchange rate movements cannot buffer external shocks. The money supply in the dollarizing country is limited to what it can earn via exports, borrow and receive from emigrant remittances.

A currency board enables governments to manage their external credibility problems and discipline their central banks by “tying their hands” with binding arrangements. A currency board combines three elements: an exchange rate that is fixed to another, “anchor currency”; automatic convertibility or the right to exchange domestic currency at this fixed rate whenever desired; and a long-term commitment to the system. A currency board system can ultimately be credible only if central bank holds official foreign exchange reserves sufficient to at least cover the entire monetary base. Exchange rate movements cannot buffer external shocks.

A fixed peg system fixes the exchange rate against a single currency or a currency basket. The time inconsistency problem is reduced through commitment to a verifiable target. However, the availability of a devaluation option provides a policy tool for handling large shocks. Its potential drawbacks are that it provides a target for speculative attacks, avoids exchange rate volatility, but not necessarily persistent misalignments, does not by itself place hard constraints on monetary and fiscal policy and that the credibility effect depends on accompanying institutional measures and a visible record of accomplishment.

=== Monetary union ===
A currency or monetary union is a multi-country zone where a single monetary policy prevails and inside which a single currency or multiple substitutable currencies, move freely. A monetary union has common monetary and fiscal policy to ensure control over the creation of money and the size of government debts. It has a central management of the common pool of foreign exchange reserves, external debts and exchange rate policies. The monetary union has common regional monetary authority i.e. common regional central bank, which is the sole issuer of economy wide currency, in the case of a full currency union.

The monetary union eliminates the time inconsistency problem within the zone and reduces real exchange rate volatility by requiring multinational agreement on exchange rate and other monetary changes. The potential drawbacks are that member countries suffering asymmetric shocks lose a stabilization tool—the ability to adjust exchange rates. The cost depends on the extent of asymmetric costs and the availability and effectiveness of alternative adjustment tools.

== Flexible exchange rate ==
These systems do not particularly reduce time inconsistency problems nor do they offer specific techniques for maintaining low exchange rate volatility.

A crawling peg attempts to combine flexibility and stability using a rule-based system for gradually altering the currency's par value, typically at a predetermined rate or as a function of inflation differentials. A crawling peg is similar to a fixed peg; however, it can be adjusted based on clearly defined rules. A crawling peg is often used by (initially) high-inflation countries or developing nations who peg to low inflation countries in attempt to avoid currency appreciation. At the margin a crawling peg provides a target for speculative attacks. Among variants of fixed exchange rates, it imposes the least restrictions, and may hence yield the smallest credibility benefits. The credibility effect depends on accompanying institutional measures and record of accomplishment.

Exchange rate bands allow markets to set rates within a specified range; edges of the band are defended through intervention. It provides a limited role for exchange rate movements to counteract external shocks while partially anchoring expectations. This system does not eliminate exchange rate uncertainty and thus motivates development of exchange rate risk management tools. On the margin a band is subject to speculative attacks. It does not by itself place hard constraints on policy, and thus provides only a limited solution to the time inconsistency problem. The credibility effect depends on accompanying institutional measures, a record of accomplishment and whether the band is firm or adjustable, secret or public, band width and the strength of the intervention requirement.

Managed float exchange rates are determined in the foreign exchange market. Authorities can and do intervene, but are not bound by any intervention rule. They are often accompanied by a separate nominal anchor, such as an inflation target. The arrangement provides a way to mix market-determined rates with stabilizing intervention in a non-rule-based system. Its potential drawbacks are that it does not place hard constraints on monetary and fiscal policy. It suffers from uncertainty from reduced credibility, relying on the credibility of monetary authorities. It typically offers limited transparency.

In a pure float, the exchange rate is determined in the market without public sector intervention. Adjustments to shocks can take place through exchange rate movements. It eliminates the requirement to hold large reserves. However, this arrangement does not provide an expectations anchor. The exchange rate regime itself does not imply any specific restriction on monetary and fiscal policy.
