= Currency basket =

Financial portfolio

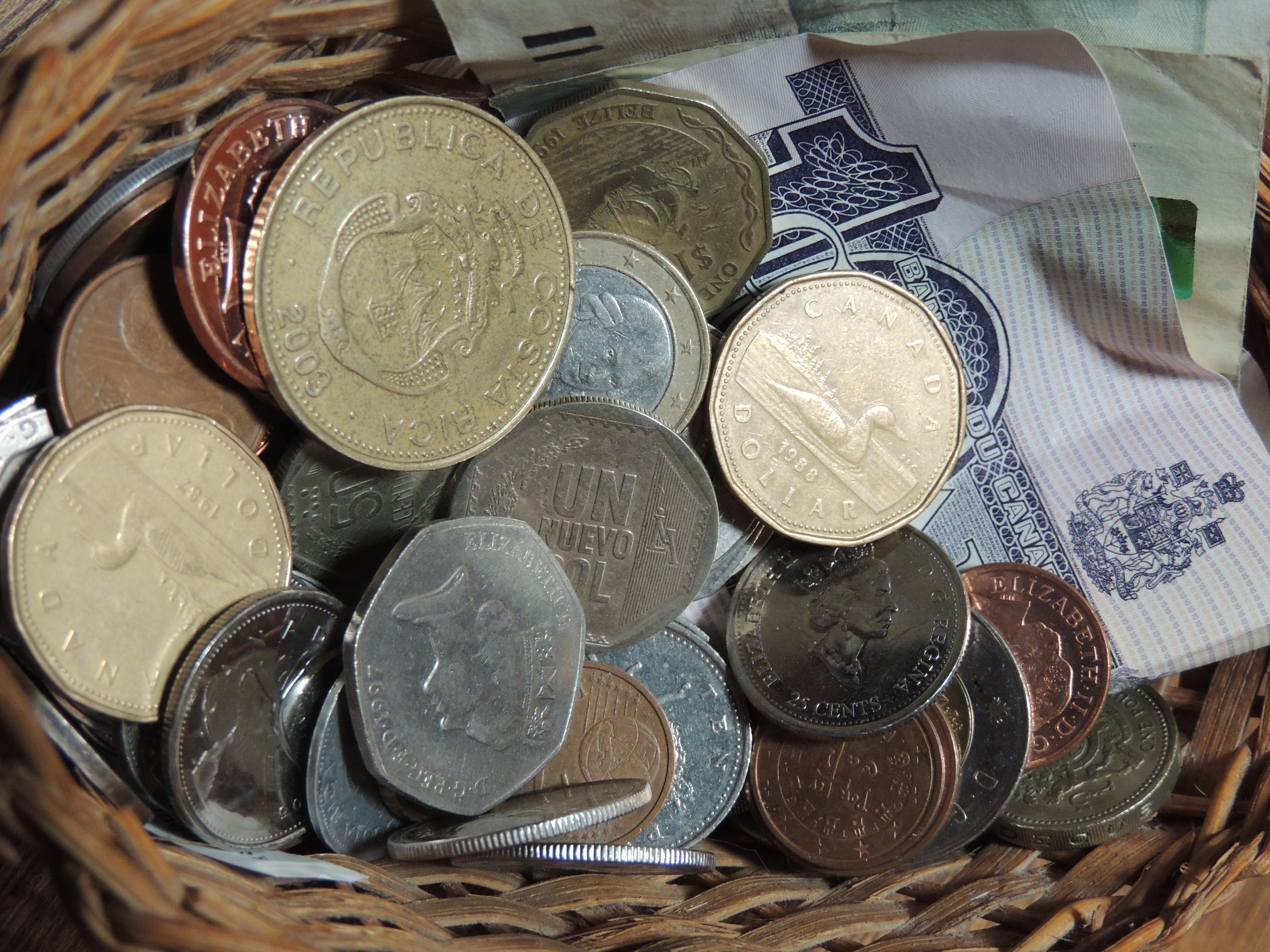
A literal basket of currency.

A currency basket is a portfolio of selected currencies with different weightings. A currency basket is commonly used by investors to minimize the risk of currency fluctuations and also governments when setting the market value of a country's currency.

An example of a currency basket is the European Currency Unit that was used by the European Community member states as the unit of account before being replaced by the euro. Another example is the special drawing rights of the International Monetary Fund.

A well-known measure is the U.S. dollar index, which is used by Forex traders. There are six currencies forming the index: five major currencies – Euro, Japanese yen, British pound, Canadian dollar, and Swiss franc – and the Swedish krona.

== History and current use ==
After major world currencies began to float in 1973, small countries in reaction decided to peg their currencies to one of the major currencies (e.g. U.S. Dollar, Pound Sterling). This led to a greater fluctuation against other major currencies and soon, some of the countries elected to manage the currency movements using more currencies, important for the given country, i.e. started to use currency baskets.

In following years, greater diversification in international trade led to greater use of the currency baskets and by 1985, according to IMF data, 63 countries had tried the currency basket policy and 43 of them were using it at the time.

In the following decades, the number of countries that anchored their exchange rate to a currency composite declined and in 2019, there were only eight of them. Three tracked the special drawing rights (SDR) as the sole currency basket or as a component of a broader reference basket (Botswana, Libya, Syria). Morocco tracked the euro and the U.S. dollar basket, and the remaining four countries did not disclose the composition of their reference currency baskets (Fiji, Kuwait, Singapore, Vietnam).

== Use and benefits ==
Baskets of currencies are ideal for small countries with less diversified production, which are well integrated with the global economy and thus more vulnerable to external disturbances. These countries tend to have smaller volumes of foreign exchange transactions, relatively inelastic trade flows, and less developed financial markets, which can make free floating exchange rates costly. At the same time, peg to a single major currency would lead to an undesired float against other currencies corresponding to the float of the currency to which the country’s currency would be pegged.

The use of currency baskets generally leads to a more stable international trade competition, mitigates shocks to a country's trade balance and stabilizes its GDP. Basket pegs might also reduce an inflow of foreign short-term capital which is likely to be subject to a short-term exchange rate risk and to a sudden reversal in the direction of the capital flow. In other words, the basket-peg regime makes the country less dependent on risky foreign capital, while not affecting long-term foreign investments such as portfolio and direct investments.

== Basket choice ==
The choice of a basket should be based on a policy objective of the authorities. This objective can be defined as a relative price variable like the terms of trade and the real exchange rate, or as a macroeconomic variable such as the balance of trade and the balance of payments.

Once the objective is defined, the choice of currencies and their weights in the basket can be made on the basis of the relative importance the authorities attach to an exchange rate stability against various currencies. The greater the vis-à-vis stability required, the greater the relative weight of a currency in the basket should be and selecting a basket with only a small number of currencies is generally preferred as the subsequent basket operation becomes easier.

Three approaches towards determining the ideal relative weights are used. Some countries rely on their own econometric models, which are based on the country’s payments and trade with their partners and indirect effects of other countries in the same markets. Others set the relative weights based purely on bilateral trade shares, which, however, might not be the optimal solution, and some elect to use ready-made baskets (e.g. SDR) – especially if its shares contain the country's trade partners.

The authorities should regularly review the relative currency weights in the basket and adjust them based on current economic situation.

== Basket valuation ==
Choice of currency weights does not itself determine the value of home currency as the same set of weights can result in different values depending on a method used to weigh changes in the component currencies. Choice of the averaging method is made based on currency characteristics that are deemed desirable. A geometric average method should be used when authorities’ policy objective is maintaining predetermined currency weights. A harmonic average method has a built-in appreciation (anti-inflation) bias and thus is optimal for price stability. An arithmetic average is best for maintaining the real effective exchange rate with its bias towards nominal depreciation. More information about averaging methods with a specific example here.

One issue of the basket peg is that because the home currency fluctuates against the currency used for interventions in the economy, the provision of forward facilities may become a problem for many developing countries. In such cases, the policymakers should peg the home currency to a standard basket, which is a basket consisting of fixed physical units of currencies. Given the same set of currencies, the standard basket method should give the same value of the home currency as the harmonic average method. In practice, some minor currencies that are not traded in the market may have to be excluded from the standard basket and the weights of remaining currencies that are positively correlated with the excluded currencies should be increased.

== Operation of a basket peg ==
Several issues, which do not occur in the operation of a single currency peg, arise with the currency basket peg. They include how often to quote the exchange rate, whether or not to disclose the basket composition and how wide of a currency band margin to maintain. These issues arise from the fact that the exchange rate of the home currency constantly changes in terms of the currency that is used to intervene in the market to maintain the value of the basket, but the rate is still dictated by a specific exchange rate rule.

In theory, to adhere strictly to a basket peg rule under given conditions, the authorities must continuously calculate and quote the exchange rate against the intervention currency and must always be ready to sell or buy whatever amount of the intervention currency is necessary to support that rate. This is impossible to achieve in reality, thus a strict basket peg policy is not practicable.

Less frequent exchange rate quotations (e.g. once a day) require at least a minimal margin around parity as the official exchange rate, quoted in intervals, may differ from the constantly changing theoretical rate. This deviation makes the basket-pegged currencies more vulnerable to speculation as foreign exchange dealers may short-sell or short-buy them more often. To prevent the speculations, most countries with tailor-made baskets have decided not to publicly disclose the composition of their baskets.

To ensure currency’s security, authorities may further vary the margins around the parity value unpredictably to dissuade foreign dealers from estimating the basket composition based on the currency’s exchange rate movements against other currencies. They may also adjust basket’s value or composition to offset a loss of competitiveness or to accommodate a change in a structure of the country’s trade. Excessive use of the interventions may, however, lead to a loss of monetary discipline and credibility which are key for proper functioning of the basket peg valuation system.

== Currency basket in investing ==
The currency basket is generally used to avoid high currency volatility. This can be used in Forex trading, which is based on the opposition of one currency against another. Thus, a big jump of either currency can create unpleasant circumstances for the trader. If a Forex investor chooses to trade the United States dollar against many other currencies, they should use the U.S. dollar index. Traders can compose their own baskets with different weights and apply them to any trading strategy.

== See also ==
- Currency
- Exchange rate regime
- Fixed exchange rate system
- Floating exchange rate
- Managed float regime
- Foreign exchange market
- Basket (finance)
- WOCU
