= Exchange rate regime =

Monetary policy relating to currency exchange rates

De facto exchange-rate arrangements in 2023 as classified by the International Monetary Fund: Floating (floating and free floating) Soft pegs (conventional peg, stabilized arrangement, crawling peg, crawl-like arrangement, pegged exchange rate within horizontal bands) Hard pegs (no separate legal tender, currency board) Residual (other managed arrangement)

An exchange rate regime is a way a monetary authority of a country or currency union manages the currency about other currencies and the foreign exchange market. It is closely related to monetary policy and the two are generally dependent on many of the same factors, such as economic scale and openness, inflation rate, the elasticity of the labor market, financial market development, and capital mobility.

There is no correct or optimal exchange rate. However, the exchange rate has distributional consequences with winners and losers in the domestic economy. Exporters and importers lose with currency appreciation while consumers and domestic oriented industries benefit from currency appreciation. A currency depreciation has the opposite effect.

There are two major regime types:

- Floating (or flexible) exchange rate regimes exist where exchange rates are determined solely by market forces, and often manipulated by open-market operations. Countries do have the ability to influence their floating currency from activities such as buying/selling currency reserves, changing interest rates, and through foreign trade agreements.
- Fixed (or pegged) exchange rate regimes exist when a country sets the value of its home currency directly proportional to the value of another currency or commodity. For years, many currencies were fixed (or pegged) to gold. If the value of gold rose, the value of the currency fixed to gold would also rise. Today, many currencies are fixed (pegged) to floating currencies from major nations. Many countries have fixed their currency value to the U.S. dollar, the euro, or the British pound.

There are also intermediate exchange rate regimes that combine elements of the other regimes.

This classification of exchange rate regime is based on the classification method carried out by GGOW (Ghos, Guide, Ostry and Wolf, 1995, 1997), which combined the IMF de jure classification with the actual exchange behavior so as to differentiate between official and actual policies. The GGOW classification method is also known as the trichotomy method.

== Fixed versus floating ==
There are many factors a country should consider before deciding on a fixed or floating currency, with pros and cons to both choices. There is no "correct" level of the exchange rate and the overall national welfare effect of a particular exchange rate regime is very hard to calculate. However, there are clear distributional consequences to the exchange rate regime. Export- and import-competing industries lose from currency appreciation whereas domestically oriented (non‐tradeables) industries benefit from it. Consumers also gain from currency appreciation as the price of imported goods fall. Currency deprecation has the opposite effect, benefitting export- and import-competing industries and harming consumers and domestically oriented industries.

If a country chooses to fix its local currency to that of another country (like the US dollar) they achieve exchange rate stability. This means that any time that country trades with the United States or conducts trade denominated in US dollars, there is certainty around how much the local currency will be worth in terms of US dollars. Businesses enjoy this certainty and pegging a currency can often lead to foreign direct investment (FDI). However, when a country decides to fix their currency they give up monetary autonomy. They are not able to set their own exchange rates, and thus the relative strength or weakness of their currency is fully dependent on the strength or weakness of the currency they have chosen to fix their local currency to.

If a country chooses to be free-floating like the US dollar, they are monetarily independent- however they lose the exchange rate stability that fixed currencies have. Notice you can not achieve a currency that is monetarily independent yet also has an exchange rate stability. This inability to have both is part of a concept known as the incompatible trinity. When deciding upon a currency regime countries can achieve two out of three things: full financial integration, exchange rate stability, or monetary independence. A country can never have a currency that achieves all three.

== Exchange rate regimes ==
Exchange rate regimes
SN	Regime type	Regime	Example
1	Floating rate	Free float	No example.
2	Floating rate	Managed/Dirty float	US dollar
3	Intermediate rate	Band (Target zone)	European monetary system
4	Intermediate rate	Crawling peg	
5	Intermediate rate	Crawling band	
6	Intermediate rate	Currency basket peg	
7	Fixed exchange rate	Currency board	Gold standard
8	Fixed exchange rate	Dollarization	
9	Fixed exchange rate	Currency union	

== Floating exchange rate regime ==
A floating (or flexible) exchange rate regime is one in which a country's exchange rate fluctuates in a wider range and the country's monetary authority makes no attempt to fix it against any base currency. A movement in the exchange is either an appreciation or depreciation.

Free float (or floating exchange rate)

Under a free float, also known as clean float, a currency's value is allowed to fluctuate in response to foreign-exchange market mechanisms without government intervention.

Managed float (or dirty float)

Under a managed float, also known as dirty float, a government may intervene in the market exchange rate in a variety of ways and degrees, in an attempt to make the exchange rate move in a direction conducive to the economic development of the country, especially during an extreme appreciation or depreciation.

A monetary authority may, for example, allow the exchange rate to float freely between an upper and lower bound, a price "ceiling" and "floor".

== Intermediate rate regime ==
The exchange rate regimes between the fixed ones and the floating ones.

Band (or target zone)

There is only a tiny variation around the fixed exchange rate against another currency, well within plus or minus 2%.

For example, Denmark has fixed its exchange rate against the euro, keeping it very close to 7.44 krone = 1 euro (0.134 euro = 1 krone).

Crawling peg

A crawling peg is when a currency steadily depreciates or appreciates at an almost constant rate against another currency, with the exchange rate following a simple trend.

Crawling band

Some variation about the rate is allowed, and adjusted as above: for example, see Colombia from 1996 to 2002 and Chile in the 1990s.

Currency basket peg

A currency basket is a portfolio of selected currencies with different weightings. The currency basket peg is commonly used to minimize the risk of currency fluctuations. For example, Kuwait shifted the peg based on a currency basket that consists of currencies of its major trade and financial partners.

== Fixed exchange rate regime ==
A fixed exchange rate regime, sometimes called a pegged exchange rate regime, is one in which a monetary authority pegs its currency's exchange rate to another currency, a basket of other currencies or to another measure of value (such as gold), and may allow the rate to fluctuate within a narrow range. To maintain the exchange rate within that range, a country's monetary authority usually needs to intervene in the foreign exchange market. A movement in the peg rate is called either revaluation or devaluation.

Currency board

Currency board is an exchange rate regime in which a country's exchange rate maintain a fixed exchange rate with a foreign currency, based on an explicit legislative commitment. It is a type of fixed regime that has special legal and procedural rules designed to make the peg "harder—that is, more durable". Examples include the Hong Kong dollar against the U.S. dollar and Bulgarian lev against the Euro.

Dollarisation

Dollarisation, also currency substitution, means a country unilaterally adopts the currency of another country.

Most of the adopting countries are too small to afford the cost of running its own central bank or issuing its own currency. Most of these economies use the U.S. dollar, but other popular choices include the euro, and the Australian and New Zealand dollars.

Currency union

A currency union, also known as monetary union, is an exchange regime where two or more countries use the same currency. Under a currency union, there is some form of transnational structure such as a single central bank or monetary authority that is accountable to the member states.

Examples of currency unions are the Eurozone, CFA and CFP franc zones. One of the first known examples is the Latin Monetary Union that existed between 1865 and 1927. The Scandinavian Monetary Union existed between 1873 and 1905.

== See also ==
- European Exchange Rate Mechanism
