= Smithsonian Agreement =

1971 multinational concord on the convertibility of the US dollar

The Smithsonian Agreement, announced in December 1971, created a new dollar standard, whereby the currencies of a number of industrialized states were pegged to the US dollar. These currencies were allowed to fluctuate by 2.25% against the dollar. The Smithsonian Agreement was created when the Group of Ten (G-10) states (Belgium, Canada, France, Germany, Italy, Japan, the Netherlands, Sweden, the United Kingdom, and the United States) raised the price of gold to 38 dollars, an 8.5% increase over the previous price at which the US government had promised to redeem dollars for gold. In effect, the changing gold price devalued the dollar by 7.9%.

Despite President Nixon calling the agreement the "greatest monetary agreement in the history of the world," it failed to encourage discipline by the Federal Reserve or the United States government. It attempted to maintain fixed exchange rates without gold backing for any currency and offered only a token devaluation of the dollar. As a result, U.S. inflation continued to increase, making the dollar's overvaluation untenable. By 1973, Japan and European nations abandoned the fixed rates and allowed their currencies to float, with all industrialized states following suit within a decade.

== Background ==
The Bretton Woods Conference of 1944 established an international fixed exchange rate system based on the gold standard, in which currencies were pegged to the United States dollar, itself convertible into gold at $35/ounce.

A deteriorating balance of trade, growing public debt incurred by the Vietnam War and Great Society programs, and monetary inflation by the Federal Reserve caused the dollar to become increasingly overvalued in the 1960s. The drain on US gold reserves culminated with the London Gold Pool collapse in March 1968.

On August 15, 1971, US President Richard Nixon unilaterally suspended the convertibility of US dollars into gold. The United States had deliberately offered this convertibility in 1944; it was put into practice by the U.S. Treasury. The suspension made the dollar effectively a fiat currency.

Nixon's administration subsequently entered negotiations with industrialized allies to reassess exchange rates following this development.

Meeting in December 1971 at the Smithsonian Institution in Washington D.C., the Group of Ten signed the Smithsonian Agreement. The US pledged to peg the dollar at $38/ounce (instead of $35/ounce; in other words: the USD rate lost 7.9%) with 2.25% trading bands, and other countries agreed to appreciate their currencies versus the dollar: Yen +16.9%; Deutsche Mark +13.6%, French Franc +8.6%, British pound the same, Italian lira +7.5%. The group also planned to balance the world financial system using special drawing rights alone.

== Development ==
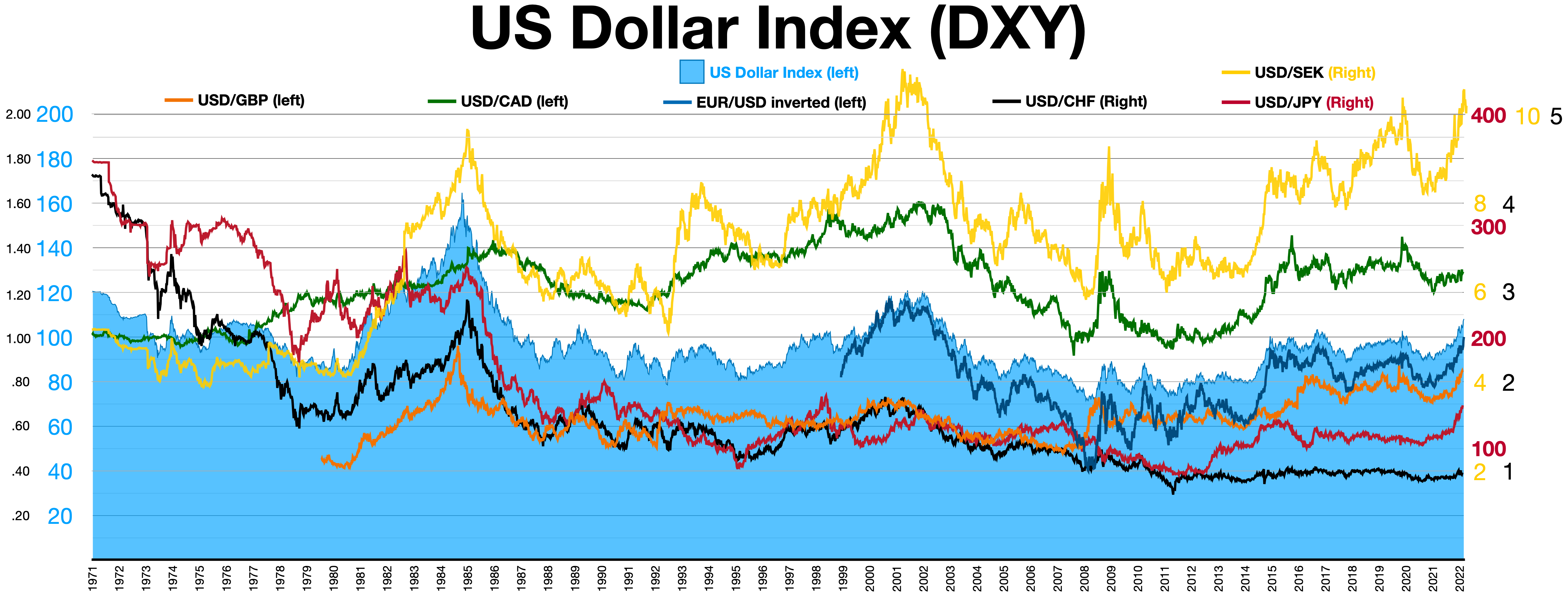
US Dollar Index (DXY) In the early 1970s, this graph shows some currencies at fixed exchange rates before floating against each other: USD/GBP exchange rate USD/CAD exchange rate EUR/USD (inverted) exchange rate USD/JPY exchange rate USD/SEK exchange rate USD/CHF exchange rate

Although the Smithsonian Agreement was hailed by President Nixon as a fundamental reorganization of international monetary affairs, it failed to encourage discipline by the Federal Reserve or the United States government. The dollar price in the gold free market continued to cause pressure on its official rate; and soon after a 10% devaluation was announced on 14 February 1973, Japan and the OEEC countries decided to let their currencies float. A decade later, all industrialized states had done the same.

== See also ==
- Bretton Woods system
- Exchange rate
- Floating currency
- History of money
- ISO 4217
- Japanese yen
- Sherman Silver Purchase Act
- Snake in the tunnel
- United States Mint
