= Devaluation =

Economic term

In macroeconomics and modern monetary policy, a devaluation is an official lowering of the value of a country's currency within a fixed exchange rate system, in which a monetary authority formally sets a lower exchange rate of the national currency in relation to a foreign reference currency or currency basket. The opposite of devaluation, a change in the exchange rate making the domestic currency more expensive, is called a revaluation. A monetary authority (e.g., a central bank) maintains a fixed value of its currency by being ready to buy or sell foreign currency with the domestic currency at a stated rate; a devaluation is an indication that the monetary authority will buy and sell foreign currency at a lower rate.

However, under a floating exchange rate system (in which exchange rates are determined by market forces acting on the foreign exchange market, and not by government or central bank policy actions), a decrease in a currency's value relative to other major currency benchmarks is instead called depreciation; likewise, an increase in the currency's value is called appreciation.

Related but distinct concepts include inflation, which is a market-determined decline in the value of the currency in terms of goods and services (related to its purchasing power). Altering the face value of a currency without reducing its exchange rate is a redenomination, not a devaluation or revaluation.

== Historical usage ==
Devaluation is most often used in a situation where a currency has a defined value relative to the baseline. Historically, early currencies were typically coins, struck from gold or silver by an issuing authority, which certified the weight and purity of the precious metal. A government in need of money and short on precious metals might decrease the weight or purity of the coins without any announcement, or else decree that the new coins have equal value to the old, thus devaluing the currency. Later, with the issuing of paper currency as opposed to coins, governments decreed them to be redeemable for gold or silver (a gold standard). Again, a government short on gold or silver might devalue by decreeing a reduction in the currency's redemption value, reducing the value of everyone's holdings.

With the widespread abandonment of metallic standards during the 20th century, devaluation became a formal policy tool under fixed exchange rate systems. Under arrangements such as the gold exchange standard and later the Bretton Woods system, national currencies were pegged either directly to gold or indirectly to the United States dollar, which itself was convertible to gold. In this context, devaluation referred to an official downward adjustment of a currency’s fixed exchange rate relative to gold or another currency, typically undertaken to address persistent trade deficits or balance-of-payments crises.

During the interwar period, many countries resorted to devaluation in response to the economic pressures of the Great Depression. As global demand collapsed and deflation intensified, governments devalued their currencies to stimulate exports and domestic production. The United Kingdom’s departure from the gold standard in 1931 and subsequent depreciation of the pound sterling marked a major shift away from rigid exchange-rate commitments, prompting similar actions by other nations.

Under the Bretton Woods system (1944–1971), devaluation was permitted but tightly controlled. Member states were allowed to adjust their exchange rates only in cases of “fundamental disequilibrium,” subject to approval by the International Monetary Fund (IMF). Several notable devaluations occurred during this period, including the devaluation of the British pound in 1949 and 1967. These adjustments were often politically contentious, as devaluation reduced the international purchasing power of wages and savings while increasing import prices.

The collapse of the Bretton Woods system in the early 1970s led most major economies to adopt floating exchange rates, significantly reducing the formal role of devaluation in advanced economies. Under floating regimes, currency values are determined primarily by market forces, and declines in exchange rates are typically referred to as depreciation rather than devaluation, as they are not the result of an official government decree.

Nevertheless, devaluation has remained an important policy tool in countries maintaining fixed or managed exchange rate regimes, particularly in developing and emerging economies. In such cases, governments have periodically devalued their currencies to restore competitiveness, address foreign exchange shortages, or comply with IMF-supported adjustment programs. While devaluation can improve export performance and reduce trade imbalances, it may also contribute to higher inflation, reduced real incomes, and increased debt burdens when liabilities are denominated in foreign currencies.

In contemporary macroeconomic usage, the term devaluation is therefore primarily historical or institutional, referring specifically to deliberate policy actions under fixed exchange rate systems, rather than to market-driven exchange rate movements.

== Causes ==
Fixed exchange rates are usually maintained by a combination of legally enforced capital controls and the central bank standing ready to purchase or sell domestic currency in exchange for foreign currency. Under fixed exchange rates, persistent capital outflows or trade deficits will involve the central bank using its foreign exchange reserves to buy domestic currency, to prop up demand for the domestic currency and thus to prop up its value. However, this activity is limited by the amount of foreign currency reserves the central bank owns; the prospect of running out of these reserves and having to abandon this process may lead a central bank to devalue its currency in order to stop the foreign currency outflows.

In an open market, the perception that a devaluation is imminent may lead speculators to sell the currency in exchange for the country's foreign reserves, increasing pressure on the issuing country to make an actual devaluation. When speculators buy out all of the foreign reserves, a balance of payments crisis occurs. Economists Paul Krugman and Maurice Obstfeld present a theoretical model in which they state that the balance of payments crisis occurs when the real exchange rate (exchange rate adjusted for relative price differences between countries) is equal to the nominal exchange rate (the stated rate). In practice, the onset of crisis has typically occurred after the real exchange rate has depreciated below the nominal rate. The reason for this is that speculators do not have perfect information; they sometimes find out that a country is low on foreign reserves well after the real exchange rate has fallen. In these circumstances, the currency value will fall very far very rapidly. This is what occurred during the 1994 economic crisis in Mexico.

== Economic implications ==
There are significant economic consequences for the country that devalues its currency to address its economic problems. A devaluation in the exchange rate lowers the value of the domestic currency in relation to all other countries, most significantly with its major trading partners. It can assist the domestic economy by making exports less expensive, enabling exporters to more easily compete in the foreign markets. It also makes imports more expensive, providing a disincentive for domestic consumers to purchase imported goods, leading to lower levels of imports (which can benefit domestic producers), but which reduces the real income of consumers. Devaluation tends to improve a country's balance of trade (exports minus imports) by improving the competitiveness of domestic goods in foreign markets while making foreign goods less competitive in the domestic market by becoming more expensive. Higher import prices lowers real imports. The combined effect will be to reduce or eliminate the previous net outflow of foreign currency reserves from the central bank, so if the devaluation has been to a great enough extent the new exchange rate will be maintainable without foreign currency reserves being depleted any further. However, the devaluation increases the prices of imported goods in the domestic economy, thereby fueling inflation. This, in turn, increases the costs in the domestic economy, including demands for wage increases, all of which eventually flow into exported goods. These dilute the initial economic boost from the devaluation itself. Also, to combat inflation, the central bank would increase interest rates, hitting economic growth. A devaluation could also result in an outflow of capital and economic instability. In addition, a domestic devaluation merely shifts the economic problem to the country's major trading partners, which may take counter-measures to offset the impact on their economy arising out of a loss of trade income arising from the initial devaluation.

== Devaluations in modern economies ==
=== UK economy ===
==== 1949 devaluation ====
At the outbreak of World War II, in order to stabilise sterling, the pound sterling was pegged to the United States dollar at the rate of $4.03 with exchange controls restricting convertibility volumes. This rate was confirmed by the Bretton Woods agreements of 1944.

After the war, US Lend-Lease funding, which had helped finance the UK's high level of wartime expenditure, abruptly ended and the Anglo-American loan was conditional upon progress towards sterling becoming fully convertible into US dollars, thereby aiding US trade. In July 1947, sterling became convertible but the resultant drain on the UK's foreign exchange reserves of US dollars was such that 7 weeks later, convertibility was suspended, rationing tightened and expenditure cuts made. The exchange rate reverted to its pre-convertibility level, a devaluation being avoided by the new Chancellor of the Exchequer, Stafford Cripps, choking off consumption by increasing taxes in 1947.

By 1949, in part due to a dock strike, the pressure on UK reserves supporting the fixed exchange rate mounted again at a time when Cripps was seriously ill and recuperating in Switzerland. Prime Minister Clement Attlee delegated a decision on how to respond to three young ministers whose jobs included economic portfolios, namely Hugh Gaitskell, Harold Wilson and Douglas Jay, who collectively recommended devaluation. Wilson was despatched with a letter from Attlee to tell Cripps of their decision, expecting that the Chancellor would object, which he did not. On 18 September 1949, the exchange rate was reduced from $4.03 to $2.80 and a series of supporting public expenditure cuts imposed soon afterwards.

==== 1967 devaluation ====
When the Labour Government of Prime Minister Harold Wilson came to power in 1964, the new administration inherited an economy in a more precarious state than expected with the estimated balance of payments deficit for the year amounting to £800 million, twice as high as Wilson had predicted during the election campaign. Wilson was opposed to devaluation, in part due to the bad memories of the 1949 devaluation and its negative impact on the Attlee government, but also because he had repeatedly asserted that Labour was not the party of devaluation. Devaluation was avoided by a combination of tariffs and raising $3bn from foreign central banks.

By 1966, pressure on sterling was intensifying, due in part to the seamen's strike, and the case for devaluation being articulated in the higher echelons of government, not least by the deputy prime minister George Brown. Wilson resisted and eventually pushed through a series of deflationary measures in lieu of devaluation including a 6 month wage freeze.

After a brief period in which the deflationary measures relieved sterling, pressure mounted again in 1967 as a consequence of the Six-Day War, the Arab oil embargo and a dock strike. After failing to secure a bail-out from the Americans or the French, a devaluation from US$2.80 to US$2.40 took effect on 18 November 1967. In a broadcast to the nation the following day, Wilson said,

From now the pound abroad is worth 14% or so less in terms of other currencies. It does not mean, of course, that the pound here in Britain, in your pocket or purse or in your bank, has been devalued. What it does mean is that we shall now be able to sell more goods abroad on a competitive basis.

Nevertheless the devaluation forced James Callaghan to resign as Chancellor of the Exchequer, making way for Roy Jenkins.

=== Other economies ===
The People's Bank of China devalued the renminbi twice within two days by 1.9% and 1% in July 2015 in response to slowing economic growth, leading to the 2015–2016 Chinese stock market turbulence. Although the devaluation was welcomed by the International Monetary Fund, it led the United States Department of the Treasury to label China as a currency manipulator in 2019. On 5 August 2019, China devalued its currency in response to the imposition of trade tariffs by the United States against China.

India devalued the Indian rupee by 35% in 1966. In July 1991, facing an external payment crisis, India devalued the rupee about 18% in USD terms.

Mexico devalued the Mexican peso against the United States dollar in 1994 in preparation for the North American Free Trade Agreement, leading to the Mexican peso crisis.

On January 11, 1994, France decided to devaluate the CFA franc in 14 African countries in Central Africa and West Africa.

== See also ==
- Currency appreciation and depreciation
- Beggar thy neighbour
- Currency war
- Debasement
- Deflation
- Fixed exchange rate
- Inflation
- Internal devaluation
- Monetary policy
- Revaluation
- Store of value
