= Snake in the tunnel =

Prototype of the European Exchange Rate Mechanism

The snake in the tunnel was a system of European monetary cooperation in the 1970s which aimed at limiting fluctuations between different European currencies. It was the first attempt at European monetary cooperation. It attempted to create a single currency band for the European Economic Community (EEC), essentially pegging all the EEC currencies to one another.

The metaphorical name is explained in a European Parliament briefing:

On 24 April 1972, EEC central-bank governors concluded the 'Basel Agreement', creating a mechanism called the ‘Snake in the tunnel’. Under this mechanism, Member States' currencies could fluctuate (like a snake) within narrow limits against the dollar (the tunnel) and central banks could buy and sell European currencies, provided that they remained within the fluctuation margin of 2.25%.

The Werner Report has a graph that resembles a snake in a tunnel on p.43, but does not use that expression.

The "tunnel" collapsed in 1973 when the US dollar floated freely. The "snake" proved unsustainable, with several currencies leaving and in some cases rejoining; the French franc left in 1974, rejoined, and left again in 1976 despite appreciating against the US dollar. By 1977, it had become a Deutsche Mark zone with just the Belgian and Luxembourg franc, the Dutch guilder and the Danish krone tracking it. The Werner plan was abandoned. The European Monetary System followed the "snake" as a system for monetary coordination in the EEC.

== Background and implementation ==
Pierre Werner presented a report on economic and monetary union to the EEC on 8 October 1970. The first of three recommended steps involved the coordination of economic policies and a reduction in fluctuations between European currencies.

With the failure of the Bretton Woods system with the Nixon shock in 1971, the Smithsonian Agreement set bands of ±2.25% for currencies to move relative to their central rate against the US dollar. This provided a tunnel within which European currencies could trade. However, it implied much larger bands in which they could move against each other: for example if currency A started at the bottom of its band it could appreciate by 2.25% against the dollar, while if currency B started at the top of its band it could depreciate by 2.25% against the dollar.

If both happened simultaneously, then currency A would appreciate by 4.5% (of their central rate) against currency B. This was seen as excessive, and the Basel agreement in 1972 between the six existing EEC members and three about to join established a snake in the tunnel with bilateral margins between their currencies limited to 1.125%, implying a maximum change between any two currencies of 2.25%, and with all the currencies tending to move together against the dollar. This agreement also led to the formal end of the Sterling Area.

According to Barry Eichengreen, the snake was troubled by economic shocks (such as the 1973 oil crisis and commodity market disruptions), which had asymmetric implications for different European countries, leading to greater unemployment in some countries than others. As a consequence, some European countries were pressured to respond in expansionary ways. Officials in different European countries also had different views as to the correct response to economic difficulties, with some preferring to maintain price stability while others preferred expansionary monetary initiatives. These differences, coupled with a lack of political integration in Europe, made it difficult for national governments to cede power to a common European monetary policy.
