= Revaluation =

Official change in value of currency

Revaluation is a change in a price of a good or product, or especially of a currency, in which case it is specifically an official rise of the value of the currency in relation to a foreign currency in a fixed exchange rate system. In contrast, a devaluation is an official reduction in the value of the currency. Under floating exchange rates, a rise in a currency's value is an appreciation. Altering the face value of a currency without changing its purchasing power is a redenomination, not a revaluation (this is typically accomplished by issuing a new currency with a different, usually lower, face value and a different, usually higher, exchange rate while leaving the old currency unchanged; then the new replaces the old).

In a fixed exchange rate system, the central bank maintains an officially announced exchange rate by standing ready to buy or sell foreign currency at that rate. In general terms, revaluation of a currency is a calculated adjustment to a country's official exchange rate relative to a chosen baseline. The baseline could in principle be anything from wage rates to the price of gold to a foreign currency. In a fixed exchange rate regime, only a decision by a country's government (specifically, its central bank) can alter the official value of the currency.

For example, suppose a government has set 10 units of its currency equal to one US dollar. To revalue, the government might change the rate to 9.9 units per dollar. This would result in that currency being slightly more expensive to people buying that currency with U.S. dollars than previously and the US dollar costing slightly less to those buying it with foreign currency.

== Causes ==
If the fixed value of a currency is sufficiently low, the central bank will experience an inflow of foreign currency, because foreigners will find it inexpensive to acquire the local currency from the central bank and use it to purchase locally produced goods. With foreign currency flowing into its store of reserves, in principle the central bank could maintain this situation indefinitely, and indeed domestic exporters will like this situation. However, the central bank may experience political pressure from two sources to increase the value of the currency: Domestic consumers will complain that they find it expensive to acquire foreign currency with which to buy importable goods; and foreign governments, on behalf of foreign exporters, may urge such a revaluation to improve their countries' sale of exports.

== Effects ==
A revaluation of the local currency to a higher value vis-a-vis other currencies will make it less expensive for local consumers to acquire the foreign funds with which to import foreign goods, so they will do more importing. Domestic producers, on the other hand, will be able to sell fewer export goods because foreign consumers will find it more expensive to obtain the local funds with which to pay for them; so the country will export less. Thus its balance of trade will move to a smaller surplus or to a deficit, and the central bank will experience a decrease in its net inflow of foreign currency to its reserves, or even a reversal to a net outflow.

== See also ==
- Revaluation of fixed assets
- Currency appreciation and depreciation
