= Managed float regime =

Term from the banking sector

A managed float regime, also known as a dirty float, is a type of exchange rate regime where a currency's value is allowed to fluctuate in response to foreign-exchange market mechanisms (i.e., supply and demand), but the central bank or monetary authority of the country intervenes occasionally to stabilize or steer the currency's value in a particular direction. This is in contrast to a pure float where the value is entirely determined by market forces, and a fixed exchange rate where the value is pegged to another currency or a basket of currencies.

Under a managed float regime, the central bank might buy or sell its own currency in the foreign exchange market to counteract short-term fluctuations, to prevent excessive depreciation or appreciation, or to achieve certain economic goals such as controlling inflation or boosting exports.

In an increasingly integrated world economy, the currency rates impact any given country's economy through the trade balance. In this aspect, almost all currencies are managed since central banks or governments intervene to influence the value of their currencies. According to the International Monetary Fund, as of 2013, 82 countries and regions used a managed float, or 43% of all countries, constituting a plurality amongst exchange rate regime types.

International financial organizations, like the IMF, categorize countries' exchange rate regimes based on specific criteria, but these classifications aren't necessarily objective and may not fully capture the nuances of a country's exchange rate policies. For example, a country may normally have a floating exchange rate regime but intervene in times of extreme volatility, a country may formally claim to be following one exchange rate regime (de jure) while having another in practice (de facto).

For more detail on each country's exchange rate regime, it is recommended to read IMF's Annual Report on Exchange Arrangements and Exchange Restrictions.

== Countries with managed floating currencies ==
De facto exchange-rate arrangements in 2023 as classified by the International Monetary Fund: Floating (floating and free floating) Soft pegs (conventional peg, stabilized arrangement, crawling peg, crawl-like arrangement, pegged exchange rate within horizontal bands) Hard pegs (no separate legal tender, currency board) Residual (other managed arrangement)

The below is a list of countries where, in 2022, the IMF has classified the regime as "Other managed arrangement" or "Stabilized arrangement", or where the IMF states that the de jure arrangement is a managed float. The IMF reclassifies the countries frequently based on the actions of their central banks.

In its annual report, the IMF also notes instances where central banks have intervened, even for countries where it still classifies the currency as free floating. For instance, the Japanese Ministry of Finance, it notes, has "intervened in the foreign exchange market in September 22, October 21, and October 24, 2022, to address excess volatility and disorderly exchange rate movement for the first time since 2011".

Country	Stabilized arrangement	Other managed arrangement	De jure managed float
Afghanistan			de jure managed
Algeria			de jure managed
Angola		Other managed	
Armenia	Stabilized		
Azerbaijan	Stabilized		
Bangladesh		Other managed	
Bolivia	Stabilized		
Burundi			de jure managed
Cambodia			de jure managed
China		Other managed	de jure managed
Costa Rica			de jure managed
Dominican Republic		Other managed	de jure managed
Ethiopia			de jure managed
Ghana		Other managed	
Guatemala	Stabilized		
Guinea	Stabilized		de jure managed
Guyana	Stabilized		
Haiti		Other managed	
Honduras	Stabilized		
Iran		Other managed	de jure managed
Kuwait		Other managed	
Laos		Other managed	de jure managed
Lebanon	Stabilized		
Liberia			de jure managed
Malawi	Stabilized		
Maldives	Stabilized		
Mozambique	Stabilized		
Myanmar	Stabilized		de jure managed
Pakistan		Other managed	
Papua New Guinea	Stabilized		
North Macedonia	Stabilized		
Romania	Stabilized		de jure managed
Serbia	Stabilized		de jure managed
Sierra Leone		Other managed	
Singapore			de jure managed
Solomon Islands		Other managed	
South Sudan		Other managed	
Sudan	Stabilized		
Syria		Other managed	
Tajikistan	Stabilized		de jure managed
Tanzania	Stabilized		
Tonga		Other managed	de jure managed
Trinidad and Tobago	Stabilized		
Ukraine	Stabilized		
Vanuatu		Other managed	
Venezuela		Other managed	
Vietnam	Stabilized		de jure managed
Zimbabwe		Other managed	

== See also ==
- December Mistake
- Black Wednesday
- Fixed exchange rate
- Floating exchange rate or floating currency
