= Monetary discipline =

Monetary discipline is a phrase used by some economists when speaking of monetary policy, generally meaning limiting the money supply of an economy in some way.

== Definitions ==
One definition of monetary discipline is a central bank matching the money supply to the level of production or reserves in an economy. This definition holds that money printing should have a relationship to a particular economic equation, rather than being influenced by politics.

Another definition is constraining the money supply, limiting inflation, and growing an economy by increasing the velocity of money.

Another way of achieving monetary discipline is by keeping a pegged exchange rate, thereby matching a money supply to a foreign currency.
