= Crawling peg =

Exchange rate regime which allows gradual losses/gains in currency value

In macroeconomics, crawling peg is an exchange rate regime that allows currency depreciation or appreciation to happen gradually. It is usually seen as a part of a fixed exchange rate regime.

The system is a method to fully use the key attributes of the fixed exchange regimes, as well as the flexibility of the floating exchange rate regime. The system is shaped to peg at a certain value, but at the same time is designed to "glide" to respond to external market uncertainties.

== Changing rates ==
=== External pressure ===
To react to external pressure (such as interest rate differentials or changes in foreign-exchange reserves) to appreciate or depreciate the exchange rate, the system can have moderately-sized, frequent exchange rate changes to ensure that the economic dislocation is minimized.

=== Rate formulae ===
Some central banks use a formula that triggers a change when certain conditions are met, while others prefer not to use a preset formula and frequently change the exchange rate to discourage speculations.

== Advantages and disadvantages ==
The main advantages of a crawling peg are that it avoids economic instability as a result of infrequent and discrete adjustments (fixed exchange rate), and it minimizes the rate of uncertainty and volatility since the fluctuation in the exchange rate is kept minimal (floating exchange regime).

For example, Mexico used a crawling peg to address inflation in the peso crisis. It transitioned from a fixed exchange rate in the 1990s without the instability of rapid devaluation.

In practice, the system may not be an "ideal system" under certain scenarios. For instance, if there are substantial currency flows that may affect the exchange rate, monetary authorities may be "forced" to accelerate currency realignment, leading to substantial unsystematic costs to market players. In practice, only a few countries have adopted crawling pegs.

== Delayed peg ==
E. Ray Canterbery proposes an idea of a delayed peg to eliminate many disadvantages of the crawling peg model. The delayed peg uses a wideband for exchange-rate fluctuations, while the band is allowed to move when foreign exchange liabilities accumulate (at a secret but predetermined rate). In China, a new use of a "floating band" is essentially a delayed peg.

== Currencies using a crawling peg ==
According to the IMF's "Annual Report on Exchange Arrangements and Exchange Restrictions 2014", only two countries—Nicaragua's córdoba and Botswana's pula—had a crawling-peg exchange rate arrangement at the time.

- China uses a floating band model, i.e., essentially a delayed peg.
- The Nicaraguan córdoba has used a crawling peg since 1991.
- The Botswana pula has used a crawling peg since 2005.
- The Vietnamese đồng used a crawling peg until January 2016. Since then it has used a managed float.
- The Argentine peso used, then abandoned, a crawling peg model between 1978 and 1981 named La Tablita. Also, a floating band model, which is essentially a delayed peg, was adopted between 2018 and 2019. In December of 2023, two days after the assumption of president Javier Milei, a crawling peg model was implemented to devalue the Argentine peso at a fixed monthly rate of 2%—a rate that will be brought down to 1% in February of 2025 after inflation goals were achieved.
- The Bangladeshi taka has used a crawling peg to the US dollar since 8 May 2024.
- The Ecuadorian sucre had a crawling peg model until it was replaced with USD in March 2000.
- The Uruguayan peso was on a crawling peg model (tablita) from 1978 until 1982, when the currency was abruptly devalued ("the tablita was broken") and triggered an economic crisis.
- The Costa Rican colón was on a crawling peg model until October 17, 2006.

== See also ==
- Exchange-rate regime
- José Alfredo Martínez de Hoz
- Adolfo Diz
