= Floating exchange rate =

Currency value as determined by foreign market events

De facto exchange-rate arrangements in 2023 as classified by the International Monetary Fund. Floating (floating and free floating) Soft pegs (conventional peg, stabilized arrangement, crawling peg, crawl-like arrangement, pegged exchange rate within horizontal bands) Hard pegs (no separate legal tender, currency board) Residual (other managed arrangement)

In macroeconomics and economic policy, a floating exchange rate (also known as a fluctuating or flexible exchange rate) is a type of exchange rate regime in which a currency's value is allowed to fluctuate in response to international events affecting exchange rates. A currency that uses a floating exchange rate is known as a floating currency. In contrast, a fixed currency is one where its value is specified in terms of material goods, another currency, or a group of other currencies. The idea of a fixed currency is to reduce currency fluctuations.

In the modern world, most of the world's currencies are floating, and include the majority of the most widely traded currencies: the United States dollar, the euro, the Japanese yen, the pound sterling, or the Australian dollar. However, even with floating currencies, central banks sometimes participate in markets to attempt to influence the value of floating exchange rates. The Canadian dollar has not seen interference by the Canadian national bank with its price since September 1998. The US dollar also sees very little change of its foreign reserves.

From 1946 to the early 1970s, the Bretton Woods system made fixed currencies the norm; however, during 1971, the US government decided to discontinue maintaining the dollar exchange at 1/35 of an ounce of gold and so its currency was no longer fixed. After the end of the Smithsonian Agreement in 1973, most of the world's currencies followed suit. However, some countries, such as most of the Arab states of the Persian Gulf region, fixed their currency to the value of another currency, which has been associated more recently with slower rates of growth. When a currency floats, quantities other than the exchange rate itself are used to administer monetary policy (see open-market operations).

== Economic rationale ==
Some economists believe that in most circumstances, floating exchange rates are preferable to fixed exchange rates. As floating exchange rates adjust automatically, they enable a country to dampen the effect of shocks and foreign business cycles and to preempt the possibility of having a balance of payments crisis. However, they also engender unpredictability as the result of their variability, which can render businesses' planning risky since the future exchange rates during their planning periods are uncertain.

However, in certain situations, fixed exchange rates may be preferable for their greater stability and certainty. That may not necessarily be true, considering the results of countries that attempt to keep the prices of their currency "strong" or "high" relative to others, such as the UK, or the Southeast Asia countries before the 1997 Asian financial crisis.

The debate of choosing between fixed and floating exchange rate methods is formalized by the Mundell–Fleming model, which argues that an economy (or the government) cannot simultaneously maintain a fixed exchange rate, free capital movement, and an independent monetary policy. It must choose any two for control and leave the other to market forces.

The primary argument for a floating exchange rate is that it allows monetary policies to be useful for other purposes. Using fixed rates, monetary policy is committed to the single goal of maintaining the exchange rate at its announced level. However, the exchange rate is only one of the many macroeconomic variables that monetary policy can influence. A system of floating exchange rates leaves monetary policymakers free to pursue other goals, such as stabilizing employment or prices.

During an extreme appreciation or depreciation of currency, a central bank will normally intervene to stabilize the currency. Thus, the exchange rate methods of floating currencies may more technically be known as managed float. A national bank might, for instance, allow a currency price to float freely between an upper and lower bound, a price "ceiling" and "floor". Management by a national bank may take the form of buying or selling large lots in order to provide price support or resistance or, in the case of some national currencies, there may be legal penalties for trading outside these bounds.

== Aversion to floating ==
A free floating exchange rate increases foreign exchange volatility. Some economists believe that this could cause serious problems, especially in developing economies. Those economies have a financial sector with one or more of following conditions:

- high liability dollarization
- financial fragility
- strong balance sheet effects

When liabilities are denominated in foreign currencies while assets are in the local currency, unexpected depreciations of the exchange rate deteriorate bank and corporate balance sheets and threaten the stability of the domestic financial system.

Therefore, developing countries seem to have greater aversion to floating, as they have much smaller variations of the nominal exchange rate but experience greater shocks from interest rate and reserve changes. This is the consequence of frequent free floating countries' reaction to exchange rate changes with monetary policy and/or intervention in the foreign exchange market.

The number of countries that show aversion to floating increased significantly during the 1990s.

== See also ==
- Domestic liability dollarization
- List of countries with floating currencies
- Currency appreciation and depreciation
