= Currency board =

Monetary authority to maintain a fixed exchange rate

In public finance, a currency board is a mechanism by which a monetary authority is required to maintain a fixed exchange rate with a foreign currency by fully backing the commitment with foreign holdings, or reserves. This policy objective requires the conventional objectives of a central bank to be subordinated to the exchange rate target.

Although a currency board is a common (and simple) way of maintaining a fixed exchange rate, it is not the only way. Countries often keep exchange rates within a narrow band by regulating balance of payments through various capital controls, or through international agreements, among other methods. Thus, a rough peg may be maintained without a currency board.

== History ==
In colonial administration, currency boards were popular because of the advantages of printing appropriate denominations for local conditions, and it also benefited the colony with the seigniorage revenue. The first such case was the Board of Commissioners of Currency of Mauritius, established in 1849. Other notable cases included the West African Currency Board (est. 1912), East African Currency Board (est. 1919), and successive boards serving the Straits Settlements then British Malaya. The Bank of England favored the establishment of currency boards as a way to ensure that British colonies would keep their reserves in sterling and place them in London.

However, after World War II many independent countries preferred to have central banks and independent currencies. British colonial-era currency boards only survive in the Falkland Islands (est. 1899) and Gibraltar (est. 1914).

Currency board arrangements experienced a revival of popularity in the late 20th century following negative experiences with inflation. Unlike in the colonial era, they were typically implemented by existing central banks whose mandate was correspondingly restricted.

== Overview ==
=== Features of orthodox currency boards ===
The main qualities of an orthodox currency board are:

- A currency board's foreign currency reserves must be sufficient to ensure that all holders of its notes and coins (and all bank creditors of a Reserve Account at the currency board) can convert them into the reserve currency (usually 110–115% of the monetary base M0).
- A currency board maintains absolute, unlimited convertibility between its notes and coins and the currency against which they are pegged (the anchor currency), at a fixed rate of exchange, with no restrictions on current-account or capital-account transactions.
- A currency board only earns profit from interest on foreign reserves (less the expense of note-issuing), and does not engage in forward-exchange transactions. These foreign reserves exist (1) because local notes have been issued in exchange, or (2) because commercial banks must, by regulation, deposit a minimum reserve at the Currency Board. (1) generates a seignorage revenue. (2) is the revenue on minimum reserves (revenue of investment activities less cost of minimum reserves remuneration)
- A currency board has no discretionary powers to affect monetary policy and does not lend to the government. Governments cannot print money, and can only tax or borrow to meet their spending commitments.
- A currency board does not act as a lender of last resort to commercial banks, and does not regulate reserve requirements.
- A currency board does not attempt to manipulate interest rates by establishing a discount rate like a central bank. The peg with the foreign currency tends to keep interest rates and inflation very closely aligned to those in the country against whose currency the peg is fixed.

=== Consequences of adopting a fixed exchange rate as prime target ===
The currency board in question will no longer issue fiat money but instead will only issue one unit of local currency for each unit (or decided amount) of foreign currency it has in its vault (often a hard currency such as the U.S. dollar or the euro). The surplus on the balance of payments of that country is reflected by higher deposits local banks hold at the central bank as well as (initially) higher deposits of the (net) exporting firms at their local banks. The growth of the domestic money supply can now be coupled to the additional deposits of the banks at the central bank that equals additional hard foreign exchange reserves in the hands of the central bank.

=== Pros and cons ===
The virtue of this system is that questions of currency stability no longer apply. The drawbacks are that the country no longer has the ability to set monetary policy according to other domestic considerations, and that the fixed exchange rate will, to a large extent, also fix a country's terms of trade, irrespective of economic differences between it and its trading partners. Typically, currency boards have advantages for small, open economies which would find independent monetary policy difficult to sustain. They can also form a credible commitment to low inflation.

== Examples ==
Worldwide use of the U.S. dollar and the euro: United States External adopters of the US dollar Currencies pegged to the US dollar Currencies pegged to the US dollar w/ narrow band Eurozone External adopters of the euro Currencies pegged to the euro Currencies pegged to the euro w/ narrow band Note that the Belarusian ruble is pegged to the Euro, Russian rouble and U.S. Dollar in a currency basket.

More than 70 countries have had currency boards. Currency boards were most widespread in the early and mid 20th century.

Worldwide official use of foreign currency or pegs: United States dollar users, including the United States Currencies pegged to the United States dollar Euro users, including the Eurozone Currencies pegged to the euro Australian dollar users, including Australia Indian rupee users and pegs, including India New Zealand dollar users, including New Zealand Pound sterling users and pegs, including the United Kingdom Russian ruble users, including Russia South African rand users (CMA, including South Africa) Three cases of a country using or pegging the currency of a neighbor

Hong Kong operates a currency board (Hong Kong Monetary Authority). Previously, Estonia and Bulgaria operated under currency board arrangements fixed originally to the Deutsche Mark until 1999, when the peg was switched to the Euro. Both countries eventually exited their currency boards upon joing the eurozone in January 2011 and January 2026, respectively. Argentina abandoned its currency board in January 2002 after a severe recession. To some, this emphasised the fact that currency boards are not irrevocable, and hence may be abandoned in the face of speculation by foreign exchange traders. However, Argentina's system was not an orthodox currency board, as it did not strictly follow currency board rules – a fact which many see as the true cause of its collapse. They argue that Argentina's monetary system was an inconsistent mixture of currency board and central banking elements. It is also thought that the misunderstanding of the workings of the system by economists and policymakers contributed to the Argentine government's decision to devalue the peso in January 2002. The economy fell deeper into depression before a recovery began later in the year.

The British Overseas Territories of Gibraltar, the Falkland Islands and St. Helena continue to operate currency boards, backing their locally printed currency notes with sterling reserves.

A gold standard is a special case of a currency board where the value of the national currency is linked to the value of gold instead of a foreign currency.

=== Examples against the euro ===
- Bosnia and Herzegovina convertible mark (Konvertibilna marka)

=== Examples against the U.S. dollar ===
- Hong Kong dollar
- Bermudian dollar
- Cayman Islands dollar
- Djiboutian franc
- East Caribbean dollar (Antigua and Barbuda, Dominica, Grenada, Saint Kitts and Nevis, Saint Lucia, and Saint Vincent and the Grenadines)
  - For complete listing, see United States dollar

=== Examples against the pound sterling ===
- Falkland Islands pound
- Gibraltar pound
- Saint Helena pound

=== Examples against other currencies ===
- Brunei dollar, against the Singapore dollar
- Macanese pataca, against the Hong Kong dollar
- The Faroe Islands have a de jure currency board, but in fact the Danish National Bank serves as the lender of last resort and all bank accounts are denominated in Danish kroner. The Danish National Bank refers to the Faroese króna as a "special version" of the Danish kroner, which is itself partly backed by the Euro foreign reserve of the Danish National Bank.

=== Past examples ===
- Argentine peso, pegged against the United States dollar from 1991 until 2002.
- Bahraini dinar, fixed against the pound sterling from 1966 until 1973.
- Bahamian pound, fixed against the pound sterling from 1921 until 1966
- Bahamian dollar was fixed against the United States dollar from 1966 until 1968.
- Bosnia and Herzegovina convertible mark, fixed against the Deutsche Mark from 1998 until 2002. Fixed to the Euro thereafter.
- British West African pound, fixed against the pound sterling from 1913 until 1964.
- Bulgarian lev, fixed against the Deutsche Mark from 1997 until 1999. Fixed to the Euro thereafter until 2026.
- Ceylonese Rupee, fixed against the Indian silver rupee from 1884 until 1950.
- Irish pound, pegged against pound sterling from independence until 1979, issued by a currency board until 1942.
- East African shilling, fixed against the pound sterling from 1921 until 1969.
- East German mark pegged to the West German mark.
- Estonian kroon, fixed against the Deutsche Mark from independence in 1992 until 1999. Fixed to the Euro thereafter until 2011.
- Lithuanian litas, fixed against the US dollar from 1994 until 2002. Fixed to the euro thereafter until 2015 when the litas was replaced with the euro.
- Philippine peso fixed to the 'milled dollar' during the Spanish and American colonial era, up until 1941. Pegged to the Japanese yen from 1942 to 1944. Post-independence, it was also pegged to the United States dollar from 1946 to 1959, and again from 1966 to 1983.
- Thai baht initially fixed to Pound sterling, and then the United States dollar until the Asian currency crisis

== See also ==
- Central bank
- Currency band
- Dollarization
- Monetary policy
- Argentine Currency Board
- Linked exchange rate system in Hong Kong
