= Convertibility =

Ability of money to be transformed into other stores of value

Convertibility is the quality that allows money or other financial instruments to be converted into other liquid stores of value. Convertibility is an important factor in international trade, where instruments valued in different currencies must be exchanged.

== Currency trading ==
Freely convertible currencies have immediate value on the different international markets, and few restrictions on the manner and amount that can be traded for another currency. Free convertibility is a major feature of a hard currency.

Some countries pass laws restricting the legal exchange rates of their currencies or requiring permits to exchange more than a certain amount. Some currencies, such as the North Korean won, the Transnistrian ruble, and the Cuban national peso, are officially nonconvertible and can only be exchanged on the black market. If an official exchange rate is set, its value on the black market is often lower.

Convertibility controls may be introduced as part of an overall monetary policy. For example, restrictions on the Argentine peso were introduced during an economic crisis in the 1990s and scrapped in 2002 during a subsequent crisis.

== Commodity money ==
Convertibility first became an issue of significance during the time banknotes began to replace commodity money in the money supply. Under the gold and silver standards, notes were redeemable for coin at face value, though often failing banks and governments would overextend their reserves.

Historically, the banknote has followed a common or very similar pattern in the western nations. Originally decentralized and issued from various independent banks, it was gradually brought under state control and became a monopoly privilege of the central banks. In the process, the principle that the banknote was merely a substitute for the real commodity money (gold and silver) was gradually abandoned.

Under the gold exchange standard, for example the Bretton Woods Institutions, banks of issue were obliged to redeem their currencies in gold bullion, or in United States dollars, which in turn were redeemable in gold bullion at an official rate of $35 per troy ounce. Due to limited growth in the supply of gold reserves, during a time of great inflation of the dollar supply, the United States eventually abandoned the gold exchange standard and thus bullion convertibility in 1974.

Under the contemporary international currency regimes, currencies are issued on the fiat of the issuer (a government or central bank), and carry no guarantee of convertibility to a tangible asset.

== See also ==
- Convertible security
- Virtual currency
