= Bermudian dollar =

Currency of Bermuda

ISO 4217
- Code: BMD (numeric: 060)
- Subunit: 0.01

Unit
- Symbol: $

Denominations
- Subunit
- 1/100: cent
- Banknotes: $2, $5, $10, $20, $50, $100
- Coins
- Freq. used: 1, 5, 10, 25 cents, $1

Demographics
- Date of introduction: 6 February 1970
- User(s): Bermuda (alongside the US dollar)

Issuance
- Monetary authority: Bermuda Monetary Authority
- Website: bma.bm
- Printer: De La Rue
- Mint: Royal Mint

Valuation
- Inflation: 1.9%
- Source: The World Factbook, 2017
- Pegged with: United States dollar (at par)

The Bermudian dollar or Bermuda Dollar (symbol: $; code: BMD; also abbreviated BD$) is the official currency of the British Overseas Territory of Bermuda. It is subdivided into 100 cents. The Bermudian dollar is not normally traded outside Bermuda, and is pegged to the United States dollar at a one-to-one ratio. Both currencies circulate in Bermuda on an equal basis.

== History ==
For nearly four hundred years Spanish dollars, known as "pieces of eight" were in widespread use on the world's trading routes, including the Caribbean region. However, following the revolutionary wars in Latin America, the source of these silver trade coins dried up. The United Kingdom had adopted a very successful gold standard in 1821, and so the year 1825 was an opportune time to introduce the British sterling coinage into all the British colonies. An imperial Order in Council was passed in that year for the purposes of facilitating this aim by making sterling coinage legal tender in the colonies at the specified rate of 1 Spanish dollar to 4 shillings, 4 pence sterling. As the sterling silver coins were attached to a gold standard, this exchange rate did not realistically represent the value of the silver in the Spanish dollars as compared to the value of the gold in the British gold sovereign. Because of this, the order had the effect in many colonies of driving sterling coinage out of circulation, rather than encouraging its use.

Remedial legislation had to be introduced in 1838 so as to change over to the more realistic rating of $1 = 4s 2d. However, in Jamaica, British Honduras, Bermuda, and later in the Bahamas also, the official rating was set aside in favour of what was known as the 'Maccaroni' tradition in which a British shilling, referred to as a 'Maccaroni', was treated as one quarter of a dollar. The common link between these four territories was the Bank of Nova Scotia which brought in the 'Maccaroni' tradition, resulting in the successful introduction of both sterling coinage and sterling accounts. It wasn't however until 1 January 1842 that the authorities in Bermuda formally decided to make sterling the official currency of the colony to circulate concurrently with Doubloons (64 shillings) at the rate of $1 = 4s 2d. Contrary to expectations, and unlike in the Bahamas where US dollars circulated concurrently with sterling, the Bermudans did not allow themselves to be drawn into the U. S. currency area. The Spanish dollars fell away in the 1850s but returned again in the 1870s following the international silver crisis of 1873. In 1874, the Bermuda merchants agreed unanimously to decline to accept the heavy imports of US currency except at a heavy discount, and it was then exported again. And in 1876, legislation was passed to demonetise the silver dollars for fear of them returning. In 1882, the local 'legal tender act' demonetised the gold doubloon, which had in effect been the real standard in Bermuda, and this left pounds, shillings, and pence as the sole legal tender.

The pound sterling remained the official currency of Bermuda until 1970, though the Government of Bermuda did issue its own pound banknotes. With US and Canadian coins regularly appearing in circulation in Bermuda and the possibility of the devaluation of the pound sterling, Bermuda was compelled to adopt its own decimal currency. On 6 February 1970, Bermuda introduced a new decimal currency in the form of a dollar. The nascent Bermudian dollars circulated in conjunction with the new British decimal coinage a year before it was introduced in the United Kingdom. By adopting decimalisation early, Bermuda was also able to place orders for the coinage from the Royal Mint before other Commonwealth countries seeking to decimalise could. The link between the Bermudian dollar and the pound sterling was not broken until 31 July 1972, which allowed Bermuda to align to a one-to-one exchange rate with the US dollar. The decision for Bermuda to peg its dollar to the US dollar added convenience for the multitude of American tourists and businesses upon whom Bermuda largely relied.

Since 1972, Bermudian law has required that local businesses charge prices in Bermudian dollars which, if paid in US dollars, must be accepted at a rate of 1:1. Only banks are legally allowed to exchange Bermudian dollars into US dollars or other currencies, subject to a 1.25% Foreign Currency Purchase Tax (some banks also charge an exchange fee).

== Coins ==
Prior to decimalisation and conversion to the dollar, the Government of Bermuda did not issue its own coins, other than the commemorative Bermudian crowns, since the 19th Century at the latest. In 1970, the Bermuda Monetary Authority introduced coinage with denominations of 1, 5, 10, 25, and 50 cents. From its inception, the 1-cent coin was struck out of bronze until 1988, when it was replaced with copper-plated steel. The composition of the 1-cent coin was changed to copper-plated zinc in 1991. All other denominations, at the time, were minted from cupronickel. Nickel-brass 1-dollar and 5-dollar coins were issued in 1983; neither were very popular, with the 5-dollar coin eventually being withdrawn from circulation on 1 January 1990. New 1-dollar coins that were thinner and one-third lighter than the 1983 issue were produced in 1988. The 50-cent denomination was also phased out, with the coins being called in on 1 May 1990. All denominations of Bermuda coinage depict the monarch of the United Kingdom on the obverse. From 1970 through 1985, the royal effigy by Arnold Machin was used, followed by an effigy by Raphael Maklouf from 1986 through 1998. The current obverse, introduced in 1999, is the royal effigy sculpted by Ian Rank-Broadley.

Bermuda has occasionally released commemorative coins to celebrate certain events, historical milestones, flora, and fauna. These coins bear a face value, but are generally seen more as collector's items or stores of value. Notable among these are the so-called "Bermuda triangles", which are pressed on special lobed triangular planchets, are minted in gold and silver, and come in denominations divisible by three.

=== Coins in circulation ===
Value	Composition	Mass	Diameter	Edge	Obverse	Reverse	Date of first minting	Date of Withdrawal	Date of Lapse
1 cent	Bronze	3.11 g	19.0 mm	Plain	Elizabeth II	Wild hog	1970	1987	—
1 cent	Copper-plated steel	2.80 g	19.0 mm	Plain	Elizabeth II	Wild hog	1988	1990	—
1 cent	Copper-plated zinc	2.50 g	19.0 mm	Plain	Elizabeth II	Wild hog	1991	—	—
5 cents	Cupronickel	5.00 g	21.2 mm	Plain	Elizabeth II	Angelfish	1970	—	—
10 cents	Cupronickel	2.45 g	17.9 mm	Milled	Elizabeth II	Bermuda Easter lilies	1970	—	—
25 cents	Cupronickel	5.92 g	25.0 mm	Milled	Elizabeth II	Longtail in flight	1970	—	—
50 cents	Cupronickel	12.60 g	30.5 mm	Milled	Elizabeth II	Coat of arms of Bermuda	1970	1 May 1990	30 April 2000
1 dollar	Nickel–brass	9.50 g	22.5 mm	Milled and inscribed with "Bermuda Monetary Authority"	Elizabeth II	Bermuda map and cahow	1983	—	—
1 dollar	Nickel–brass	7.56 g	26.0 mm	Alternating plain and milled	Elizabeth II	Bermuda-fitted dinghy	1988	—	—
5 dollars	Nickel–brass	12.5 g	25.5 mm	Milled and inscribed with "Bermuda Monetary Authority"	Elizabeth II	Bermuda map and onion	1983	1 January 1990	31 December 1999

== Banknotes ==
In the 20th century, its pound notes were issued in all denominations (and the only coins used were UK ones). In 1970, the government introduced dollar notes in denominations of 1, 5, 10, 20 and 50 dollars. From 1974, the Bermuda Monetary Authority took over paper money production, introducing 100-dollar notes in 1982 and 2 dollars in 1988, when the 1 dollar was replaced by a coin. 1970 dollar notes are all printed with Bermuda Government across the top. Later notes substitute Bermuda Monetary Authority. All of the "legacy" banknotes were withdrawn from circulation on 1 January 2014, but still able to be exchanged for new banknotes for 10 years. Including the original 1970 series, all horizontal-style banknotes will be phased out in favour of the vertical, 2009 series.

2000 series
Pick No.	Image		Value	Dimensions	Main Colours	Description			Date of	
Pick No.	Obverse	Reverse	Value	Dimensions	Main Colours	Obverse	Reverse	Watermark	First printing	Withdrawal
50			$2	140 × 68 mm	Blue and green on multicolour	Elizabeth II and seahorse	Map of Bermuda and Royal Naval Dockyard	Tuna fish	24 May 2000	1 January 2014
51			$5	140 × 68 mm	Purple and burgundy on multicolour	Elizabeth II and Conch shell	St. David's Lighthouse and town of St. George's	Tuna fish	24 May 2000	1 January 2014
52			$10	140 × 68 mm	Dark blue and mauve on multicolour	Elizabeth II and Oleander flowers	Flatt's Inlet, cahow, and seashell	Tuna fish	24 May 2000	1 January 2014
53			$20	140 × 68 mm	Green and red on multicolour	Elizabeth II and Burnaby House	Ely's Harbour and Somerset Bridge	Tuna fish	24 May 2000	1 January 2014
54			$50	140 × 68 mm	Bluish black, red and brown on multicolour	Elizabeth II and Commissioner's House	Map of Bermuda and Scuba divers exploring shipwreck	Tuna fish	24 May 2000	1 January 2014
55			$100	140 × 68 mm	Red-orange and brown on multicolour	Elizabeth II and Bermudiana flowers	House of Assembly of Bermuda and Camden House	Tuna fish	24 May 2000	1 January 2014
These images are to scale at 0.7 pixel per millimetre (18 pixel per inch). For table standards, see the banknote specification table.

Commemorative series
Pick No.	Image		Value	Dimensions	Main colour	Description			Date of	
Pick No.	Obverse	Reverse	Value	Dimensions	Main colour	Obverse	Reverse	Watermark	Printing	Withdrawal
40			$50	140 × 68 mm	Multicolour	Elizabeth II and Commissioner's House; Christopher Columbus Quincentenary 1492–1992	Map of Bermuda and scuba divers exploring shipwreck	Tuna fish	12 October 1992	1 January 2014
46			$100	140 × 68 mm	Multicolour	Elizabeth II and Bermudiana flowers 25th Anniversary Bermuda Monetary Authority 1969–1994	House of Assembly of Bermuda and Camden House	Tuna fish	20 February 1994	1 January 2014
47			$20	140 × 68 mm	Multicolour	Elizabeth II and Burnaby House; To commemorate the opening of the 'Burnaby House' by the Bermuda Monetary Authority	Ely's Harbour and Somerset Bridge	Tuna fish	17 January 1997	1 January 2014
56			$50	140 × 68 mm	Multicolour	Elizabeth II and Commissioner's House; To Commemorate the Coronation of Queen Elizabeth II 1953–2003	Map of Bermuda and scuba divers exploring shipwreck	Tuna fish	2 June 2003	1 January 2014
These images are to scale at 0.7 pixel per millimetre (18 pixel per inch). For table standards, see the banknote specification table.

=== Redesign ===
In 2008, it was announced that banknotes would be redesigned in celebration of Bermuda's 400th anniversary, the first redesign since the launch of the dollar. The new designs were described as "distinctly Bermudian", with Queen Elizabeth II being relegated to a minor position, using a royal effigy by Machin. They feature themes and scenes of maritime Bermuda, and like their predecessors are coloured by value. The serial number prefix on the first million notes is that of a Bermuda onion; subsequent notes will bear a conventional prefix. The series was issued on 9 March 2009. The Bermuda Monetary Authority was awarded "Bank Note of the Year" by the International Banknote Society for the design of the new $2 banknote. The 2009-series $50 banknote was modified in August 2012 to depict the correct species of longtail native to Bermuda. Originally, it erroneously depicted the red-billed tropicbird and was changed to the indigenous white-tailed tropicbird.

Polymer versions of the $2 and $5 notes were issued in 2024. The design was based on the existing notes but included an image of King Charles III and new security features.

2009 series
Pick No.	Image		Value	Dimensions	Main Colour	Description			Date of	
Pick No.	Obverse	Reverse	Value	Dimensions	Main Colour	Obverse	Reverse	Watermark	First printing	Issue
57			$2	140 × 68 mm	Turquoise	Bluebird (Sialia sialis)	Dockyard Clock Tower and statue of Neptune	Hibiscus flower	1 January 2009	9 March 2009
58			$5	140 × 68 mm	Pink	Blue marlin (Makaira nigricans)	Horseshoe Bay Beach and Somerset Bridge	Hibiscus flower	1 January 2009	9 March 2009
59			$10	140 × 68 mm	Purple	Blue angelfish (Holacanthus bermudensis)	Deliverance and Commissioner's House	Hibiscus flower	1 January 2009	9 March 2009
60			$20	140 × 68 mm	Green	Whistling frog (Eleutherodactylus johnstonei)	Gibbs Hill Lighthouse and St. Mark's Church	Hibiscus flower	1 January 2009	9 March 2009
61			$50	140 × 68 mm	Yellow	Longtail (Phaethon lepturus)	St. Peter's Church	Hibiscus flower	1 January 2009	9 March 2009
62			$100	140 × 68 mm	Red	Red cardinal (Cardinalis cardinalis) on a branch of loquat (Eriobotrya japonica)	House of Assembly of Bermuda and Bermuda petrel (Pterodroma cahow)	Hibiscus flower	1 January 2009	9 March 2009
These images are to scale at 0.7 pixel per millimetre (18 pixel per inch). For table standards, see the banknote specification table.

Current BMD exchange rates
From Google Finance:	AUD CAD CHF CNY EUR GBP HKD JPY USD KRW EUR JPY
From Yahoo! Finance:	AUD CAD CHF CNY EUR GBP HKD JPY USD KRW EUR JPY
From XE.com:	AUD CAD CHF CNY EUR GBP HKD JPY USD KRW EUR JPY
From OANDA:	AUD CAD CHF CNY EUR GBP HKD JPY USD KRW EUR JPY

== See also ==
- Economy of Bermuda

== Sources ==
- "Bermuda Monetary Act 1969" (PDF). Government of Bermuda. 20 February 1969. Archived from the original (PDF) on 19 June 2022.
- "Bermuda Monetary Authority (Currency Forms and Designs, etc.) Regulations 1988" (PDF). Government of Bermuda. 8 July 1988. BR 44/1988. Archived from the original (PDF) on 29 July 2022.
- "Bermuda Monetary Authority (Currency Forms and Designs, etc.) Regulations 2007" (PDF). Government of Bermuda. 22 October 2007. pp. 3–4. BR 92/2007. Archived from the original (PDF) on 29 July 2022.
- Chalmers, Robert (1893). A History of Currency in the British Colonies. London: Her Majesty's Stationery Office.
- Cuhaj, George S, ed. (2010). Standard Catalog of World Coins: 1901–2000 (37th ed.). Krause Publications. ISBN 978-0-89689-814-1.
- Cuhaj, George S, ed. (2009). Standard Catalog of World Paper Money: 1961–present (15th ed.). Krause Publications. ISBN 978-0-89689-837-0.
- Kennedy, Neil MacRae (2005). "Bermuda". Britain and the Americas: Culture, Politics, and History. Vol. 1. ABC-CLIO. pp. 147–150. ISBN 1-85109-431-8.
