= Currency appreciation and depreciation =

Change of currency values relative to other currencies

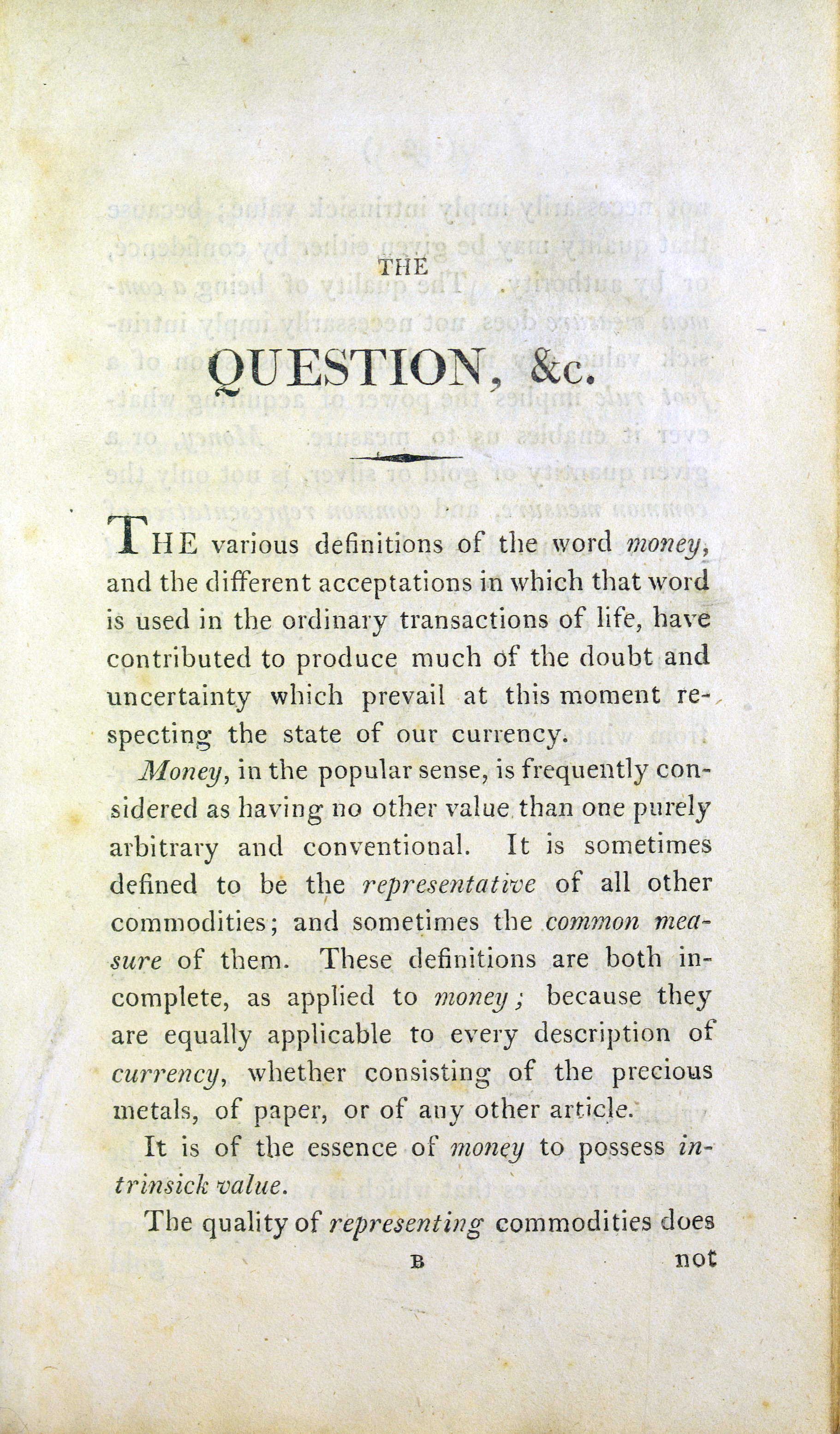
William Huskisson, Question concerning the depreciation of our currency, 1810

Currency depreciation is the loss of value of a country's currency with respect to one or more foreign reference currencies, typically in a floating exchange rate system in which no official currency value is maintained. Currency appreciation in the same context is an increase in the value of the currency. Short-term changes in the value of a currency are reflected in changes in the exchange rate.

There is no optimal value for a currency. High and low values have tradeoffs, along with distributional consequences for different groups.

== Causes ==
In a floating exchange rate system, a currency's value goes up (or down) if the demand for it goes up more (or less) than the supply does. In the short run this can happen unpredictably for a variety of reasons, including the balance of trade, speculation, or other factors in the international capital market. For example, a surge in purchases of foreign goods by home country residents will cause a surge in demand for foreign currency with which to pay for those goods, causing a depreciation of the home currency. And the other way around, if there is an inflow of foreign currency to a country, it creates demand for the home currency. This results in the appreciation of the home currency. For example, starting in May 2022, because of the war in Russia and the partial military mobilization, a lot of Russians went to live in Armenia. Since Russians brought a lot of foreign currency with them, especially dollars, it created an oversupply of dollars, therefore the price of dollars started to fall, and it depreciated. Contrary to that, there was a high demand for the Armenian dram, the home currency, since the Russian tourists had to exchange their dollars to drams to be able to buy products from local markets. Therefore, the Armenian dram has appreciated against the dollar. The appreciation of the Armenian dram still continues to grow and expectations of further inflation of foreign currencies still remain high because of the continuous inflow of international visitors and tourists.

Another cause of appreciation (or depreciation) of a currency is speculative movements of funds in the belief that a currency is under- (or over-)valued and in anticipation of a “correction”. Such movements may in themselves cause the value of a currency to change.

A longer-run trend of appreciation (or depreciation) is likely to be caused by home country inflation being lower (or higher) on average than inflation in other countries, according to the principle of long-run purchasing power parity.

== Economic effects ==
When a country's currency appreciates in relation to foreign currencies, foreign goods become cheaper in the domestic market and there is overall downward pressure on domestic prices. In contrast, the prices of domestic goods paid by foreigners go up, which tends to decrease foreign demand for domestic products.

A depreciation of the home currency has the opposite effects. Thus, depreciation of a currency tends to increase a country's balance of trade (exports minus imports) by improving the competitiveness of domestic goods in foreign markets while making foreign goods less competitive in the domestic market by becoming more expensive.

In the international asset transactions, a change in a currency's value may give rise to a foreign exchange gain or loss. The appreciation of the domestic currency raises the value of the holdings of foreign assets denominated in that currency, while there is an adverse impact on debt instruments.

== Market ==
To predict currency appreciation and depreciation, traders use the economic calendar. The calendar includes economic releases that determine the strengths and weaknesses of the economy. Thus, if a trader only knows that the GDP growth of the country whose currency he trades declined compared with the forecast, he can expect the fall of the domestic currency.

Also, the terms are used when talking about the central bank monetary policy. The central bank is a single authority that issues money. Thus, its policy has an impact on the domestic currency: if the central bank raises the interest rate, or gives optimistic comments on the country's economy, the domestic currency appreciates. If the bank cuts the interest rate or signals problems for the economy, the domestic currency depreciates.

== Political effects ==
Alterations in the value of a country's currency has distributional consequences within the country and between countries. As a consequence, currency depreciations and appreciations have political consequences. Currency appreciation benefits consumers, as it makes foreign goods cheaper, but it harms national producers who face greater competition with foreign producers. A depreciation has the opposite effect. Special interest groups subsequently lobby for increases or decreases in the currency. Governments are generally punished for currency depreciations.

If a country relies on many imported goods, a currency depreciation can reduce living standards, weaken economic growth, and increase inflation. However, a depreciation can also strengthen domestic producers and increase aggregate output, making it a common policy option to facilitate economic recoveries.

== See also ==
- Devaluation – Economic term
- Revaluation – Official change in value of currency
- Capital appreciation – Increase of value of finance over time (Accounting term)
- Currency carry trade – Uncovered interest arbitrage (investors borrow low-yielding currencies and lend (invest in) high-yielding currencies).
- Exchange rate – Rate at which one currency will be exchanged for another
- Marshall–Lerner condition – Economic concept
