= Currency band =

Range of values for the exchange rate

A currency band is a range of values for the exchange rate for a country’s currency which the country’s central bank acts to keep the exchange rate within.

The central bank selects a range, or "band", of values at which to set their currency, and will intervene in the market or return to a fixed exchange rate if the value of their currency shifts outside this band. This allows for some revaluation, but tends to stabilize the currency's value within the band. In this sense, it is a compromise between a fixed (or "pegged") exchange rate and a floating exchange rate.

For example, the exchange rate of the renminbi of the mainland of the People's Republic of China has been based upon a currency band; the European Economic Community's "snake in the tunnel" was a similar concept that failed, but ultimately led to the establishment of the European Exchange Rate Mechanism (ERM) and ultimately the Euro.

== See also ==
- Currency board
