= Toilet Revolution in China =

Government campaign about sanitation in China

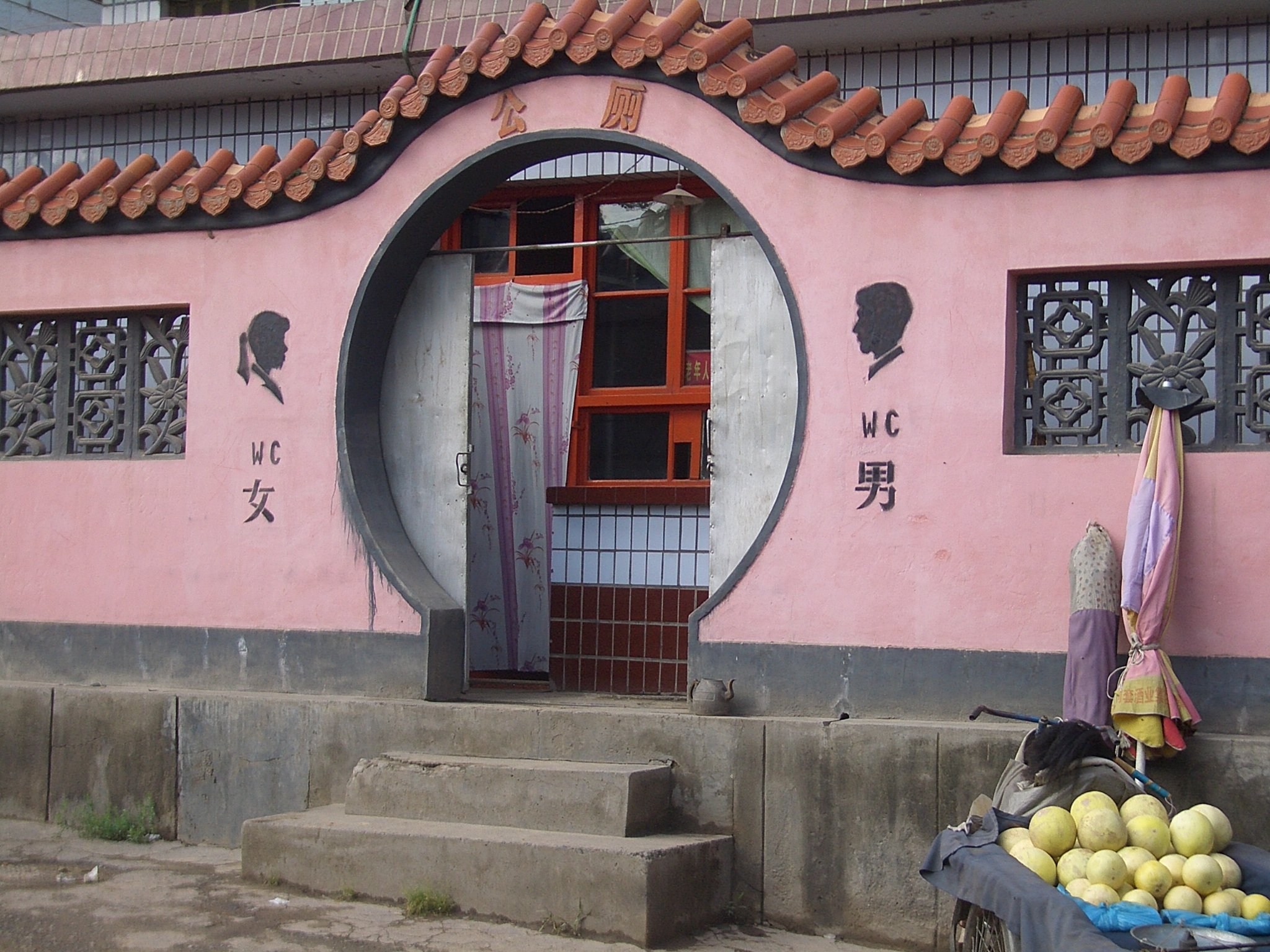
A public toilet in Linxia City, Gansu, with a window in the middle to collect the "user fee" (50 fen, about 7¢)

The Toilet Revolution (simplified Chinese: 厕所革命; traditional Chinese: 廁所革命; pinyin: Cèsuǒ Gémìng; lit. 'lavatory-place transform-mandate') is a government campaign aimed at improving the sanitary conditions in mainland China. In 2015, Xi Jinping, General Secretary of the Chinese Communist Party, announced that China is going to improve the sanitary conditions of public toilets in tourist attractions, about which foreign travelers have long complained. The "Toilet revolution" entry in the State Council Information Office's 2015 "Dictionary of Xi Jinping's new terms" explains the campaign, "Along with agricultural modernization and new rural construction, local governments will ensure that villagers have access to hygienic toilets." Xi has been praised for his leading role in the campaign.

From 2015 to 2017, over 68,000 public toilets were constructed in China. In 2017, construction of an additional 64,000 public toilets was planned. In the same year, the campaign was geographically expanded, and authorities are going to improve the poor sanitary conditions in rural areas of China. State Media reported that the unsanitary conditions in rural toilets can result in spreading diseases like malaria and the campaign aims at solving such problems.

== See also ==
- Sanitation
- Swachh Bharat Abhiyan
- Toilets in Japan
