= Second series of the renminbi =

1955 banknote issue by the People's Bank of China

The second series of Renminbi banknotes was introduced on March 1, 1955 (but dated 1953). Together with the introduction of the second series, the decimal point was moved 4 places to the left. As a result, one first series ¥10,000 note is equivalent to one second series ¥1 note.

== Coins ==
Obverse	Reverse	Value	Technical parameters		Description			Date of		
Obverse	Reverse	Value	Diameter	Composition	Edge	Obverse	Reverse	year	issue	withdrawal
		¥0.01	18 mm	Aluminium-magnesium alloy	Intermittent wire teeth	Wheat, value, year of minting	Emblem of the People's Republic of China	1955-2018	December 1, 1957	Current
		¥0.02	21 mm	Aluminium-magnesium alloy	Intermittent wire teeth	Wheat, value, year of minting	Emblem of the People's Republic of China	1956-2000	December 1, 1957	Current
		¥0.05	24 mm	Aluminium-magnesium alloy	Intermittent wire teeth	Wheat, value, year of minting	Emblem of the People's Republic of China	1955-2000	December 1, 1957	Current
For table standards, see the coin specification table.

Though rarely used, coins of the 2nd series can still be used in the People's Republic of China.

== Banknotes ==
Each note has the words "People's Bank of China" as well as the denomination in Uyghur, Tibetan and Mongolian on the back. However, Zhuang was not included as the Zhuang alphabet had not been invented yet. Those four languages have all since appeared on each new series of renminbi banknotes.

The denominations available were:

2nd Series Banknotes (1955 Edition)
Image		Value	Dimensions	Main color	Description		Date of			Remark
Obverse	Reverse	Value	Dimensions	Main color	Obverse	Reverse	issue	withdrawal	completely recalled	Remark
		¥0.01	90 × 42.5 mm	Yellow	ZIS-150 / FAW Jiefang CA10 (built in China under license of ZiS) 4-Tonne Truck	National emblem of China	March 1, 1955	July 1, 2003	April 1, 2007	With serial number and printed in China
		¥0.02	95 × 45 mm	Blue	Lisunov Li-2 (built in the Soviet Union under license of the Douglas DC-3)	National emblem of China	March 1, 1955	July 1, 2003	April 1, 2007	With serial number and printed in China
		¥0.05	100 × 47.5 mm	Green	Steam ship Hailiao, came over to the Communists from Hong Kong under the blockade of the Nationalists.	National emblem of China	March 1, 1955	July 1, 2003	April 1, 2007	With serial number and printed in China
		¥0.1	115 × 52.5 mm	Yellow-brown	Tractor	National emblem of China	March 1, 1955	December 15, 1967	January 1, 1999	Printed in China
		¥0.2	120 × 55 mm	Green	Locomotive	National emblem of China	March 1, 1955	November 15, 1971	January 1, 1999	Printed in China
		¥0.5	125 × 57.5 mm	Purple	Dam	National emblem of China	March 1, 1955	November 15, 1971	January 1, 1999	Printed in China
		¥1	150 × 67.5 mm	Red	Tiananmen	National emblem of China	March 1, 1955	October 20, 1969	January 1, 1999	Printed in China
		¥2	155 × 70 mm	Blue	Mount Baota in Yan'an, Shaanxi	National emblem of China	March 1, 1955	December 1976	January 1, 1999	Printed in China
		¥3	160 × 72.5 mm	Green	Longyuankou Bridge in Yongxin, Jiangxi	National emblem of China	March 1, 1955	April 15, 1964	May 15, 1964	Printed in Soviet Union
		¥5	165 × 75 mm	Brown	Unity of races	National emblem of China	March 1, 1955	April 15, 1964	May 15, 1964	Printed in Soviet Union
		¥10	210 × 85 mm	Blue and black	Labor and farmer	National emblem of China	December 1, 1957	April 15, 1964	May 15, 1964	Printed in Soviet Union
For table standards, see the banknote specification table.

2nd Series Banknotes (1956 Edition)
Image		Value	Dimensions	Main color	Description		Date of			Remark
Obverse	Reverse	Value	Dimensions	Main color	Obverse	Reverse	issue	withdrawal	completely recalled	Remark
		¥1	150 × 67.5 mm	Black	Tiananmen	National emblem of China	March 25, 1961	August 15, 1973	January 1, 1999	Printed in China
		¥5	165 × 75 mm	Yellow-brown	Unite of races	National emblem of China	April 20, 1962	December 1, 1983	January 1, 1999	Printed in China
For table standards, see the banknote specification table.

2nd Series Banknotes (1981 Edition)
Image		Value	Dimensions	Main color	Description		Date of			Remark
Obverse	Reverse	Value	Dimensions	Main color	Obverse	Reverse	issue	withdrawal	completely recalled	Remark
		¥0.01	Same as 1955 edition notes, but without the serial number.				July 14, 1981	July 1, 2003	April 1, 2007	Without serial number and printed in China
		¥0.02	Same as 1955 edition notes, but without the serial number.				July 14, 1981	July 1, 2003	April 1, 2007	Without serial number and printed in China
		¥0.05	Same as 1955 edition notes, but without the serial number.				July 14, 1981	July 1, 2003	April 1, 2007	Without serial number and printed in China
For table standards, see the banknote specification table.

=== Remark ===
The ¥0.01, ¥0.02, and ¥0.05 notes of the 1981 edition can also be argued as members of the third series of the renminbi due to being first issued in 1981, when the third series of the renminbi was also being issued.

The ¥3, ¥5, and ¥10 notes of the 1955 edition were printed in the Soviet Union. As a result of the Sino-Soviet split, the Soviets started printing these banknotes as counterfeits as a part of economic warfare against China. Thus, such counterfeit notes were found in Xinjiang after several border conflicts. The use of the 1955 edition banknotes was halted on April 15, 1964, and they were completely withdrawn and recalled on May 15, 1964.

The second series of the renminbi is the only series of the renminbi to include a ¥3 banknote.

Except for the ¥0.01, ¥0.02, ¥0.05, ¥3, ¥5, and ¥10 banknotes of the 1955 edition, all banknotes were completely recalled on January 1, 1999. The use of the ¥0.01, ¥0.02, and ¥0.05 banknotes of the 1955 edition was halted on July 1, 2003, and they were completely withdrawn and recalled on April 1, 2007.
