= Hot money =

Economic term

In economics, hot money is the flow of funds (or capital) from one country to another in order to earn a short-term profit on interest rate differences and/or anticipated exchange rate shifts. These speculative capital flows are called "hot money" because they can move very quickly in and out of markets, potentially leading to market instability.

== Illustration of hot money flows ==
The following simple example illustrates the phenomenon of hot money: In the beginning of 2011, the national average rate of one year certificate of deposit in the United States is 0.95%. In contrast, China's benchmark one year deposit rate is 3%. The Chinese currency (renminbi) is seriously undervalued against the world's major trading currencies and therefore is likely to appreciate against the US dollar in the coming years. Given this situation, investor in the US depositing money in a Chinese bank would get a higher return than deposits in a US bank. This makes China a prime target for hot money inflows. This is just an example for illustration. In reality, hot money takes many different forms of investment.

The following description may help further illustrate this phenomenon: "One country or sector in the world economy experiences a financial crisis; capital flows out in a panic; investors seek a more attractive destination for their money. In the next destination, capital inflows create a boom that is accompanied by rising indebtedness, rising asset prices and booming consumption - for a time. But all too often, these capital inflows are followed by another crisis. Some commentators describe these patterns of capital flow as 'hot money' that flows from one sector or country to the next and leaves behind a trail of destruction."

== Types of hot money ==
As mentioned above, capital in the following form could be considered hot money:

- Short-term foreign portfolio investments, including investments in equities, bonds and financial derivatives
- Short-term foreign bank loans
- Foreign bank loans with short-term investment horizon

The types of capital in the above categories share common characteristics: the investment horizon is short, and they can come in quickly and leave quickly.

== Estimates of total value ==
There is no well-defined method for estimating the amount of hot money flowing into a country during a period of time, because hot money flows quickly and is poorly monitored. In addition, once an estimate is made, the amount of hot money may suddenly rise or fall, depending on the economic conditions driving the flow of funds. One common way of approximating the flow of hot money is to subtract a nation's trade surplus (or deficit) and its net flow of foreign direct investment (FDI) from the change in the nation's foreign reserves.

Hot money (approx) = Change in foreign exchange reserves - Net exports - Net foreign direct investment

== Sources and causes ==
Hot money usually originates from the capital-rich, developed countries that have lower GDP growth rate and lower interest rates compared to the GDP growth rate and interest rate of emerging market economies such as India, Brazil, China, Turkey, Malaysia etc. Although the specific causes of hot money flow are somewhat different from period to period, generally, the following could be considered as the causes of hot money flow:

- a sustained decline of interest rates in the highly industrialized, developed countries. The lower interest rates in the developed nations attract investors to the high investment yields and improving economic prospects in Asia and Latin America.
- a general trend towards international diversification of investments in major financial centers and towards growing integration of world capital markets.
- Emerging market countries began to adopt sound monetary and fiscal policies as well as market-oriented reforms including trade and capital market liberalization. Such policy reforms, among others, have resulted in a credible increase in the rate of return on investments.

As described above, hot money can be in different forms. Hedge funds, other portfolio investment funds and international borrowing of domestic financial institutions are generally considered as the vehicles of hot money. In the 1997 East Asian Financial Crisis and in the 1998 Russian Financial Crisis, the hot money chiefly came from banks, not portfolio investors.

== Impact ==
Capital flows can increase welfare by enabling households to smooth out their consumption over time and achieve a higher level of consumption. Capital flows can help developed countries achieve a better international diversification of their portfolios.

However, large and sudden inflows of capital with a short-term investment horizon have negative macroeconomic effects, including rapid monetary expansion, inflationary pressures, real exchange rate appreciation and widening current account deficits. Especially, when capital flows in volume into small and shallow local financial markets, the exchange rate tends to appreciate, asset prices rally and local commodity prices boom. These favorable asset price movements improve national fiscal indicators and encourage domestic credit expansion. These, in turn, exacerbate structural weakness in the domestic bank sector. When global investors' sentiment on emerging markets shift, the flows reverse and asset prices give back their gains, often forcing a painful adjustment on the economy.

The following are the details of the dangers that hot money presents to the receiving country's economy:

- Inflow of massive capital with short investment horizon (hot money) could cause asset prices to rally and inflation to rise. The sudden inflow of large amounts of foreign money would increase the monetary base of the receiving country (if the central bank is pegging the currency), which would help create a credit boom. This, in turn, would result in such a situation in which "too much money chases too few goods". The consequences of this would be inflation.

Furthermore, hot money could lead to exchange rate appreciation or even cause exchange rate overshooting. And if this exchange rate appreciation persists, it would hurt the competitiveness of the respective country's export sector by making the country's exports more expensive compared to similar foreign goods and services.

- Sudden outflow of hot money, which would always happen, would deflate asset prices and could cause the collapse value of the currency of respective country. This is especially so in countries with relatively scarce internationally liquid assets. There is growing agreement that this was the case in the 1997 East Asian Financial Crisis. In the run-up to the crises, firms and private firms in South Korea, Thailand and Indonesia accumulated large amounts of short-term foreign debt (a type of hot money). The three countries shared a common characteristic of having large ratio of short term foreign debt to international reserves. When the capital started to flow out, it caused a collapse in asset prices and exchange rates. The financial panic fed on itself, causing foreign creditors to call in loans and depositors to withdraw funds from banks. All of these magnified the illiquidity of the domestic financial system and forced yet another round of costly asset liquidations and price deflation. In all of the three countries, the domestic financial institutions came to the brink of default on their external short term obligations.

However, some economists and financial experts argue that hot money could also play positive role in countries that have relatively low level of foreign exchange reserves, because the capital inflow may present a useful opportunity for those countries to augment their central banks' reserve holdings.

== Control ==
Generally speaking, given their relatively high interest rates compared with that of the developed market economies, emerging market economies are the destination of hot money. Although the emerging market countries welcome capital inflows such as foreign direct investment, because of hot money's negative effects on the economy, they are instituting policies to stop hot money from coming into their country in order to eliminate the negative consequences.

Different countries are using different methods to prevent massive influx of hot money. The following are the main methods of dealing with hot money.

- Exchange rate appreciation: the exchange rate can be used as a tool to control the inflow of hot money. If the currency is believed to be undervalued, that would be a cause of hot money inflow. In such circumstance, economists usually suggest a significant one-off appreciation rather than a gradual move in the exchange rate, as a gradual appreciation of the exchange rate would attract even more hot money into the country. One downside of this approach is that exchange rate appreciation would reduce the competitiveness of the export sector.
- Interest rate reduction: countries that adopt this policy would lower their central bank's benchmark interest rates to reduce the incentive for inflow. For example, on December 16, 2010, the Turkish Central Bank surprised markets by cutting interest rates at a time of rising inflation and relatively high economic growth. Erdem Basci, deputy bank governor of Turkish Central Bank argued that gradual rate cuts were the best way to prevent excessive capital inflows fuelling asset bubbles and currency appreciation. On February 14, 2011, Mehmet Simsek, the Turkish Finance Minister said: "more than $8 billion in short-term investment had exited the country after the central bank cut rates and took steps to slow credit growth. The markets have got the message that Turkey does not want hot money inflows."
- Capital controls: some capital control policies adopted by China belong to this category. For example, in China, the government does not allow foreign funds to invest directly in its capital market. Also, the central bank of China sets quotas for its domestic financial institutions for the use of short-term foreign debt and prevent banks from overusing their quotas. In June 1991, the Chilean government instituted a non-remunerated (non-paid) 20 percent reserve requirement to be deposited at the Central Bank for a period of one year for liabilities in foreign currency, for firms which are borrowing directly in foreign currency.
- Increasing bank reserve requirements and sterilization: some countries pursue a fixed exchange rate policy. In the face of large net capital inflow, those countries would intervene in the foreign exchange market to prevent exchange rate appreciation. Then sterilize the monetary impact of intervention through open market operations and through increasing bank reserves requirements. For example, when hot money originated from the U.S. enters China, investors would sell US dollars and buy Chinese yuan in the foreign exchange market. This would put upward pressure on the value of the yuan. In order to prevent the appreciation of the Chinese currency, the central bank of China print yuan to buy US dollars. This would increase money supply in China, which would in turn cause inflation. Then, the central bank of China has to increase bank reserve requirements or issue Chinese government bonds to bring back the money that it has previously released into the market in the exchange rate intervention operation. However, like other approaches, this approach has limitations. The first, the central bank can't keep increasing bank reserves, because doing so would negatively affect bank's profitability. The second, in the emerging market economies, the domestic financial market is not deep enough for open market operations to be effective.
- Fiscal tightening: the idea is to use fiscal restraint, especially in the form of spending cuts on nontradables, so as to lower aggregate demand and curb the inflationary impact of capital inflow.
