= Cryptoeconomics =

Approach to the study of digital economies

Cryptoeconomics is an evolving economic paradigm for a cross-disciplinary approach to the study of digital economies and decentralized finance (DeFi) applications. Cryptoeconomics integrates concepts and principles from traditional economics, cryptography, computer science, and game theory disciplines. Just as traditional economics provides a theoretical foundation for traditional financial (a.k.a., Centralized Finance or CeFi) services, cryptoeconomics provides a theoretical foundation for DeFi services bought and sold via fiat cryptocurrencies, and executed by smart contracts.

== Definitions and goals ==
The term cryptoeconomics was coined by Ethereum users around 2014-2015, The earliest public documented usage is a 2015 talk by Vlad Zamfir entitled "What is Cryptoeconomics?"

== History ==
The historical roots of cryptoeconomics can be traced to the rise of altcoins, prominent among them the Ethereum project, which in 2015 pioneered the integration of smart contracts into its blockchain, thereby enabling a wide range of DeFi applications.

== Subdisciplines ==
=== Crypto-macroeconomics ===
Crypto-macroeconomics is concerned with the regional, national, and international regulation of cryptocurrencies and DeFi transactions. More broadly, this subdiscipline analyzes the transmission of shocks and volatility between the emergent cryptocurrency markets and the traditional economy. Research in this area investigates the growing integration of crypto assets with conventional assets, finding significant spillover effects where shocks in one market transmit to the other. Recent studies using structural models show that cryptocurrency price shocks—driven by factors like market sentiment and technology—are quantitatively important drivers of fluctuations in traditional markets, such as equities and commodities. Furthermore, these shocks have a notable impact on key macroeconomic variables, explaining a significant portion of long-term price-level variance and thus carrying direct implications for monetary policy and inflation forecasting.

This growing economic significance has, in turn, prompted varied policy responses from governments around the world. The Group of Seven governments' interest in cryptocurrencies became evident in August 2014, when the United Kingdom Treasury commissioned a study of cryptocurrencies and their potential role in the UK economy, and issued its final report in January 2021. In June 2021, El Salvador became the first country to accept Bitcoin as legal tender. In August 2021, Cuba followed with a legal resolution to recognize and regulate cryptocurrencies such as Bitcoin. However, in September 2021, the government of China, the single largest market for cryptocurrency, declared all cryptocurrency transactions illegal, completing a crackdown on cryptocurrency that had previously banned the operation of intermediaries and miners within China.

=== Crypto-microeconomics ===
Crypto-microeconomics is concerned with the individual and enterprise usages of cryptocurrencies and DeFi transactions. A 2021 survey found that a strong majority of USA adults have heard about major cryptocurrencies (Bitcoin, Ether), and 16% said they personally had invested in, traded, or otherwise used one.

== Criticisms and controversies ==
Bitcoin, along with other cryptocurrencies, has been described as an economic bubble by many economists, including Robert Shiller, Joseph Stiglitz, Vasilis Kostakis, Richard Thaler, Paul Krugman, and Nouriel Roubini. In addition, Bitcoin and other cryptocurrencies have been criticized for the amount of electricity required for cryptocurrency “mining” (blockchain transaction validation), and for their being used to purchase illegal goods.

== See also ==
- Tokenomics
