= Jiao (currency) =

Unit of currency

A jiao (/dʒaʊ/ JOW; Chinese: 角, or in Wade–Giles, chiao), or mao (Chinese: 毛) (Cantonese: hou [Chinese: 毫]), is a unit of currency used in China, including the Mainland, Taiwan, Hong Kong, and Macao. One jiao is equal to 1/10 of a yuan or 10 fēn (分).

== Denominations ==
- The Renminbi has coins of 1, 2 and 5 jiao. The two jiao coin is no longer in circulation.
- The New Taiwan dollar has coins of 5 jiao (rarely used).
- The Hong Kong dollar has coins of 1, 2 and 5 hou (known as 10, 20 and 50 cents).
- The Macanese pataca has coins of 1, 2 and 5 hou (known as 10, 20 and 50 avos).

== See also ==
- Dime (United States coin)
- Fen (currency)
- Chinese yuan
