= First series of the renminbi =

1948/49 banknote issue by the People's Bank of China

The first series of Renminbi banknotes was introduced during the Chinese Civil War by the newly founded People's Bank of China on December 1, 1948, ten months before the founding of the People's Republic of China itself. It was issued to unify and replace the various currencies of the communist-held territories as well as the currency of the Nationalist government.

This series is also called "Old Currency", which 10,000 yuan is equal to 1 yuan of the 2nd series and later (called "New Currency").

Due to the turbulent political situation at the time, the first series is rather chaotic, with many versions issued for each denomination. The banknotes show a mixture of agricultural and industrial scenes, modes of transportation, and famous sites.

The notes were issued in 12 denominations: ¥1, ¥5, ¥10, ¥20, ¥50, ¥100, ¥200, ¥500, ¥1,000, ¥5,000, ¥10,000 and ¥50,000, with a total of 62 designs. They were officially withdrawn on various dates between April 1, 1955, and May 10, 1955.

Some of these notes have words "Republic of China" on them to show the issuance year in the Republic of China Era. Though the PRC adopted the Common Era to replace the ROC Era in 1949 and have been avoiding using "Republic of China" in any possible circumstance, these notes were issued and used until 1955, when a revaluation of Reminbi took place.

== List ==
=== ¥1 ===
Image	Obverse	Reverse	Date of issue
	Workers and farmers	Flower symbol	January 10, 1949
	Factory	Flower ball	August 1949

=== ¥5 ===
Image	Obverse	Reverse	Date of issue
	Shepherd	Flower symbol	February 23, 1949
	Sailboat	Flower symbol	January 10, 1949
	Cow and horse buggy	Flower ball	July 1949
	Spinning	Flower ball	August 1949

=== ¥10 ===
Image	Obverse	Reverse	Date of issue
	Irrigation field and mine	Flower symbol	December 1, 1948
	Sawn timber and plow	Flower symbol	February 23, 1949
	Railway Station	Flower symbol	May 25, 1949
	Workers and farmers	Temple	August 1949

=== ¥20 ===
Image	Obverse	Reverse	Date of issue
	Donkey and train	Big flower ball	December 1, 1948
	Coal mines car	Flower symbol	February 23, 1949
	Longevity Hill of Summer Palace	Flower symbol	July 1949
	Working area	Flower ball	August 1949
	Train and sailboat	Flower ball	August 1949
	Field	Flower ball	September 1949
	Longevity Hill of Summer Palace	Flower ball	October 1949

=== ¥50 ===
Image	Obverse	Reverse	Date of issue
	Donkey and tub	Flower symbol	December 1, 1948
	Train and bridge	Car	February 10, 1949
	Train and bridge	Car	June 10, 1949
	Workers and farmers	Flower symbol	August 1949
	Railway	Flower symbol	March 20, 1949
	Roller	Carriage	October 3, 1949
	Railway	Flower symbol	April 1949

=== ¥100 ===
Image	Obverse	Reverse	Date of issue
	Arable land and factory	Flower symbol	January 10, 1949
	Railway station and road	Flower symbol	February 5, 1949
	Longevity Hill of Summer Palace	Train	February 5, 1949
	Factory	Flower symbol	March 20, 1949
	Beihai Bridge	Flower symbol	March 25, 1949
	Beihai Bridge	Flower symbol	July 1949
	Ship bridge	Large flower stand	August 1949
	Donkey team	Flower symbol	November 5, 1949
	Longevity Hill of Summer Palace	Train	March 20, 1949
	Sailboat	Flower symbol	January 20, 1950

=== ¥200 ===
Image	Obverse	Reverse	Date of issue
	Summer Palace	Flower symbol	March 20, 1949
	Pai Yundian (排云殿)	Flower symbol	May 8, 1949
	Great Wall of China	Flower symbol	August 1949
	Steel factory	Flower symbol	September 1949
	Cut rice	Flower symbol	October 20, 1949

=== ¥500 ===
Image	Obverse	Reverse	Date of issue
	Village	Flower symbol	September 10, 1949
	Zhengyang Gate	Flower symbol	September 10, 1949
	Crane	Flower symbol	October 3, 1949
	Harvester	Flower symbol	October 20, 1949
	Farming	Flower symbol	April 1, 1951
	Zhandeng City (瞻德城)	Flower symbol with Uyghur characters	October 1, 1951

=== ¥1,000 ===
Image	Obverse	Reverse	Date of issue
	Arable land	Temple of Heaven	September 11, 1949
	Harvest	Flower symbol	October 3, 1949
	Three tractors	Cut wheat	November 15, 1949
	Carts and plowing	Ship	December 23, 1949
	Qiantang River Bridge	Flower ball	January 20, 1950
	Wrangler	Flower symbol with Uyghur characters	October 1, 1951

=== ¥5,000 ===
Image	Obverse	Reverse	Date of issue
	Cultivator	Flower symbol	January 20, 1950
	Factory	Flower ball	January 20, 1950
	Camels	Flower symbol with Mongolian characters	May 17, 1951
	Shepherd	Flower symbol with Uyghur characters	October 1, 1951
	Wei River Railway Bridge	Flower symbol	September 25, 1953

=== ¥10,000 ===
Image	Obverse	Reverse	Date of issue
	Ship	Flower symbol	January 20, 1950
	Arable land	Grazing cattle and sheep	January 20, 1950
	Wrangler	Flower symbol with Mongolian characters	May 17, 1951
	Camels	Flower symbol with Uyghur characters	October 1, 1951

=== ¥50,000 ===
Image	Obverse	Reverse	Date of issue
	Xinhua Gate	Tractor	December 1953
	Harvester	Produce	December 1953
