= Digital economy =

Economy based on digital computing technologies

Business leaders talking about the future of the digital economics at the World Economic Forum

The digital economy is a portmanteau of digital computing and economy, and is an umbrella term that describes how traditional brick-and-mortar economic activities (production, distribution, trade) are being transformed by the Internet and World Wide Web technologies. It has also been defined more broadly as the way "digital technologies are transforming work, organizations, and the economy."

The digital economy is backed by the spread of information and communication technologies (ICT) across all business sectors to enhance productivity. A phenomenon referred to as the Internet of Things (IoT) is increasingly prevalent, as consumer products are embedded with digital services and devices.

According to the WEF, 70% of the global economy will be made up of digital technology over the next 10 years (from 2020 onwards). This is a trend accelerated by the COVID-19 pandemic and the tendency to go online. The future of work, especially since the COVID-19 pandemic, has also contributed to the digital economy. More people are now working online, and with the increase in online activity that contributes to the global economy, companies that support the systems of the Internet are more profitable.

Digital transformation of the economy alters conventional notions about how businesses are structured, how consumers obtain goods and services, and how states need to adapt to new regulatory challenges. The digital economy has the potential to shape economic interactions between states, businesses and individuals profoundly. The emergence of the digital economy has prompted new debates over privacy rights, competition, and taxation, with calls for national and transnational regulations of the digital economy.

== Definition ==
The digital economy, also referred to as the new economy, refers to an economy in which digital computing technologies are used in economic activities.

The term digital economy came into use during the early 1990s. For example, many academic papers were published by New York University's Center for Digital Economy Research. The term was the title of Don Tapscott's 1995 book, The Digital Economy: Promise and Peril in the Age of Networked Intelligence.

According to Thomas Mesenbourg (2001), three main components of the digital economy concept can be identified:

- E-business infrastructure (hardware, software, telecom, networks, human capital, etc.),
- E-business (how business is conducted, any process that an organization conducts over computer-mediated networks),
- E-commerce (transfer of goods, for example when a book is sold online).

Bill Imlah states that new applications are blurring these boundaries and adding complexity, for example, social media and Internet search.

In the last decade of the 20th century, Nicholas Negroponte (1995) used a metaphor of shifting from processing atoms to processing bits: "The problem is simple. When information is embodied in atoms, there is a need for all sorts of industrial-age means and huge corporations for delivery. But suddenly, when the focus shifts to bits, the traditional big guys are no longer needed. Do-it-yourself publishing on the Internet makes sense. It does not for a paper copy."

The digital economy is variously known as the Internet Economy, Web Economy, Cryptoeconomy, and New Economy. Since the digital economy is continuously replacing and expanding the traditional economy, there is no clear delineation between the two integrated economy types. The digital economy results from billions of daily online transactions (data exchanges) among people, organizations (businesses, educational institutions, non-profits), and distributed computing devices (servers, laptops, smartphones, etc.) enabled by Internet, World Wide Web, and blockchain technologies.

== Development of the concept ==
There are varied definitions of the digital economy. There are multiple similar concepts for broadly the same phenomenon. According to the OECD, the Digital Economy can be defined in three different approaches:

- Bottom-up approach: characterizing industries' and firms' output or production processes to decide whether they should be included in the Digital Economy,
- Top-down or trend-based approach: first identifying the key trends driving the digital transformation and then analyzing the extent to which these are reflected in the real economy,
- Flexible or tiered approach: breaking the Digital Economy into core and non-core components, and thereby finding a compromise between adaptability and the need to arrive at some common ground on the meaning of the term.

=== Bottom-up definition ===
Bottom-up definitions define the Digital Economy as the aggregate of a specific indicator for a set of industries identified as actors in the Digital Economy. Whether an industry is considered an actor depends on the nature of the products (narrow) or the proportion of digital inputs used in production processes (broad).

Hence, from a bottom-up and narrow perspective, the Digital Economy is "all industries or activities that directly participate in producing, or crucially reliant on digital inputs." For instance, McKinsey adds up the economic outputs of the ICT sector and e-commerce market in terms of online sales of goods and consumer spending on digital equipment. While this definition is adept at measuring the impact of digitalization on economic growth, it only focuses on the nature of output and offers an incomplete view of the Digital Economy's development.

In a bottom-up and broad perspective, the Digital Economy is "all industries using digital inputs as part of their production process". Examples of digital inputs include digital infrastructure, equipment, and software but can include data and digital skills.

=== Top-down definition ===
Top-down definitions identify broad trends at play in the digital transformation and define the Digital Economy as the result of their combined impact on value creation. These include such spillovers as changes in labor market demand and regulations, platform economy, sustainability, and equality.

Unlike the bottom-up definition, the top-down definition has units of analysis extending beyond firms, industries, and sectors to include individuals, communities, and societies. While the latter definition is more inclusive, the IMF notes that it is subjective, qualitative, and open-ended, thus limiting meaningful comparative analysis.

=== Flexible definition ===
To reconcile the bottom-up and top-down definitions of the Digital Economy, Bukht and Heeks stated that the Digital Economy consists of all sectors making extensive use of digital technologies (i.e. their existence depends on digital technologies), as opposed to sectors making intensive use of digital technologies (i.e. simply employing digital technologies to increase productivity).

Under this definition, the Digital Economy is stratified into three nested tiers:

- Core: comprising the digital sector and associated core technologies. Examples include hardware manufacturing, software and IT consulting, information services, and telecommunications,
- Narrow scope: the digital economy comprising digital services and the platform-based economy,
- Broad scope: the digitalized economy comprising digitalized sectors such as e-Business, e-Commerce, advanced manufacturing, precision agriculture, algorithmic economy, sharing economy, and gig economy. These digitalized sectors phenomenologically give rise to the Fourth Industrial Revolution.

== Elements of the digital economy ==
The Digital Economy consists of all sectors making extensive use of digital technologies (i.e. their existence depends on digital technologies). However, digitalization spans many economic sectors, making it far from trivial precisely delimit the digital economy within the entire societal economy.

A narrow definition would typically just encompass core digital sectors that refers to the provisioning of digital technologies, products, services, infrastructure, and solutions, as well as all forms of economic activities that are completely dependent on digital technologies and data elements. This includes key sectors like information and communication technology (ICT), but also other economic activities such as internet finance and digital commerce that are not seen as a part of the ICT-sector.

Broader definitions also include industrial digitalization, i.e. the production quantity and efficiency improvement brought about by the application of digital technology in traditional industries, as an important extension of the digital economy into the wider societal economy. Examples of industrial digitalization in traditional sectors include remote sensing, automated farming equipment, GPS-route optimization, etc. However, few studies include industrial digitalization in the digital economy.

=== Information technology ===
The information technology (IT) sector of the U.S. now makes up about 8.2% of the country's GDP and accounts for twice its share of the GDP as compared to the last decade. 45% of spending on business equipment are investments in IT products and services, which is why companies such as Intel, Microsoft, and Dell have grown from $12 million in 1987 to more than half a billion in 1997. The widespread adoption of ICT combined with the rapid decline in price and increase in the performance of these technologies, has contributed to the development of new activities in the private and public sectors. These new technologies provide market reach, lower costs, and new opportunities for products and services that were not needed before. This changes the way multinational enterprises (MNE) and startups design their business models.

=== Digital platforms ===
A digital platform operator is an entity or person offering an online communication service to the public based on computer algorithms used to classify content, goods, or services offered online, or the connection of several parties for the sale of goods, the provision of a service, or the exchange or sharing of content, goods, and services. Digital platforms have increasingly replaced traditional physical intermediaries in connecting supply and demand. Online marketplaces such as Amazon, eBay and Alibaba enable small and medium-sized enterprises (SMEs) and consumers to participate more directly in international trade. These platforms can reduce information asymmetries and search frictions, while addressing some of the constraints associated with thin markets. This allows firms, particularly SMEs, to expand production and manage the costs associated with exporting more easily. These developments are particularly relevant to firms in developing countries. At the same time, consumers have greater opportunities to find products that match their preferences and participate more directly in importing and exporting goods. The expansion of online platforms has also contributed to an increase in the number of small packages crossing international borders. Low-value goods are particularly sensitive to trade costs, including shipping charges, border-related costs, and logistics and administrative formalities, which account for a larger proportion of the value of the goods being shipped.

Most of the largest digital platform companies are located in either the United States or China.

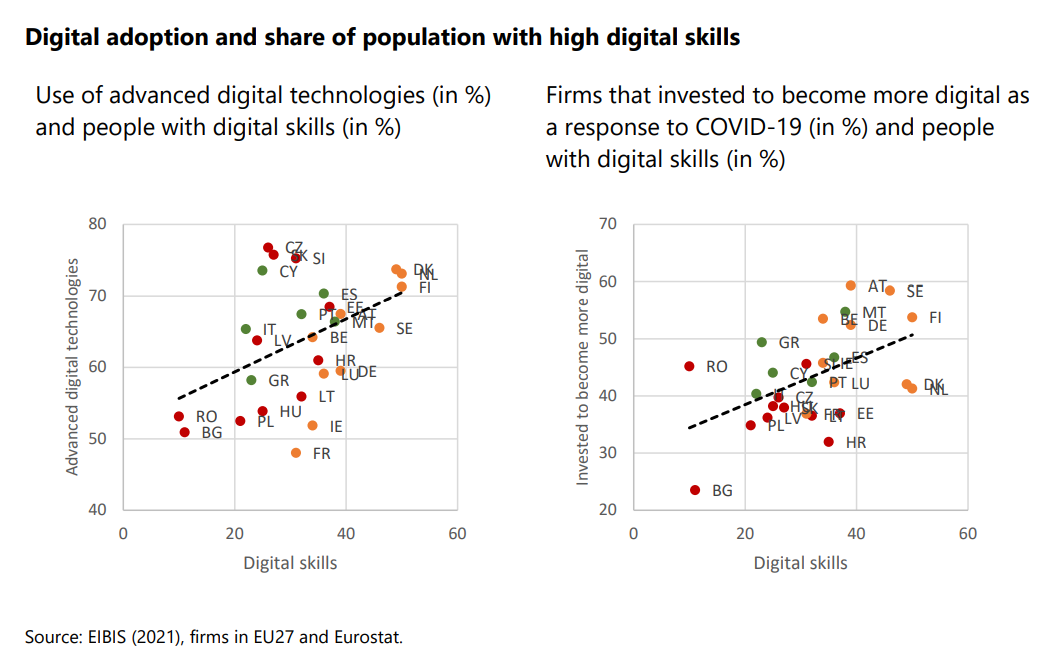
Digital adoption and share of population with high digital skills

=== Digital trade ===
In the U.S. in the 1990s, the Clinton Administration proposed The Framework for Global Electronic Commerce. It contained the promotion of five principles used to guide the U.S. government's actions towards electronic commerce so that the digital economy's growth potential remains high. These five principles include the leadership of the private sector, the government avoiding undue restrictions on e-commerce, limited government involvement, the government's recognition of the Internet's unique qualities, and the facilitation of e-commerce on a global basis.

In Africa, the potential for digital trade to contribute to economic growth and development is particularly significant. Although Africa accounts for a small share of global trade in digitally delivered services (less than 1%), exports of digitally delivered services represent the fastest-growing segment of African trade, having recorded sustained growth over the past 15 years. According to estimates from the World Trade Organization (WTO), global exports of digitally delivered services have more than quadrupled in value since 2005, recording an annual growth rate of 8.3% between 2005 and 2024. This exceeded the growth rates of goods exports (4.5%) and other services exports (4.9%).

In East Africa, Kenya is a regional leader in digital trade and innovation in digitally delivered services. It was among the pioneers of the liberalization of the telecommunications sector. Kenya has also developed a substantial digitally enabled services sector, including innovations such as mobile money, and has continued to establish itself as a regional hub for digital technologies.

Governments have primarily restricted digital trade through three means:

1. Data flow restrictions: regulations that require that companies store data (e.g. personal information, business records, financial data, government data) in a particular country or go through a process before transferring the data abroad. For example, the EU's GDPR law only permits transfers of data on EU individuals to countries that have implemented certain data privacy safeguards and been certified by the EU.
2. Data localization requirements: regulations that require that data be stored on servers within a country
3. Digital services taxes: taxes on revenues from the sale of digital services or goods (e.g. online sales, digital advertising, e-commerce, data, streaming). By 2022, 29 countries had digital service taxes.

=== Gig economy ===
The gig economy encompasses a range of employment arrangements, from low-skilled, task-based work to high-skilled professional services. Gig work is labor that mainly consists of temporary and flexible jobs usually done over delivery apps and rideshare services such as Grubhub, Uber, Lyft, and Uber Eats. It can be desirable to those who want more flexibility in their schedule and can allow workers to make additional income outside of their traditional jobs.

Most gig work supplements workers' traditional jobs. The full size of the gig economy and number of workers is not yet known. Katz and Krueger estimated that only 0.5% of gig workers make most of their income off of platforms like Uber, Lyft, Grubhub, and DoorDash. Since these workers are considered independent contractors, these companies are not responsible for giving its workers benefits packages like it would for regular full-time employees. This has resulted in the formation of unions between gig and platform workers and various reforms within the industry. Blockchain and Tokenized equity-sharing gig economy platforms are being developed to accelerate the gig economy as a full-fledged digital economy contributor using new technologies.

=== Impact on retail ===
The digital economy has had a substantial impact on retail sales of consumer product goods. One effect has been the fast proliferation of retailers with no physical presence, such as eBay or Amazon. Additionally, traditional retailers such as Walmart and Macy's and GAP have restructured their businesses to adapt to a digital economy. Some retailers, like Forever 21, have declared bankruptcy as a result of their failure to anticipate and adapt to a digital economy. Others, such as Bebe stores have worked with outside vendors to completely convert their business one that is exclusively digital. These vendors, such as IBM and Microsoft, have enabled smaller retailers to compete with large, multi-national established brands.

== Key features ==
=== Mobility ===
==== Mobility of intangibles ====
Both development and exploitation of intangible assets are key features of the digital economy. This investment in and development of intangibles such as software is a core contributor to value creation and economic growth for companies in the digital economy. In early 2000, companies started substantially increasing the amount of capital allocated to intangibles such as branding, design and, technology rather than in hardware, machinery or property.

==== Mobility of business functions ====
Advancements in information and communication technologies (ICT) have significantly reduced the cost associated with the organization and coordination of complex activities over a long period. Some businesses are increasingly able to manage their global operations on an integrated basis from a central location separate geographically from the locations in which the operations are carried out, and where their suppliers or customers are. Consequently, it has allowed businesses to expand access to remote markets and provide goods and services across borders.

=== Reliance on data ===
The Digital economy relies on personal data collection. In 1995, the Data Protection directive (Directive 95/46/CE, art.2), defined data as "any information relating to a natural person who can be identified by reference to his identification number or to information which is specific to him". At that time, this regulation emerged in response to the need to integrate the European market. By adopting common European data protection standards, the EU was able to harmonize conflicting national laws that were emerging as a trade barrier, inhibiting commerce in Europe. For this reason, GDPR and its predecessor were viewed as internal market instruments, facilitating the creation of a digital, single market by allowing an unhindered flow of data within the entire common market.

Due to its ability to bridge the information asymmetry between supply and demand, data now has an economic value. When platforms compile personal data, they gather preferences and interests, which allow companies to exert a targeted action on the consumer through advertising. Algorithms classify, reference, and prioritize the preferences of individuals to better predict their behavior.

Via free access to platforms in exchange for the collection of personal data, they make the content non-rival. Thus, the intangibility of content tends to give a collective natural aspect to this information accessible to everyone, to benefit public good by creating a digital public space. The McKinsey Global Institute Report (2014) notes five broad ways in which leveraging big data can create value for businesses:

1. Creating transparency by making data more easily accessible to stakeholders with the capacity to use the data,
2. Managing performance by enabling experimentation to analyze variability in performance and understand its root causes,
3. Segmenting populations to customize products and services,
4. Improve decision making by replacing or supporting human decision making with automated algorithms,
5. Improve the development of new business models, products, and services.

In 2011, the Boston Consulting Group estimated that personal data collected in Europe was worth 315 billion euros.

=== Network effect ===
The Network effect occurs when the value of a product or service to the user increases exponentially with the number of other users using the same product or service in servicer as carrier. For instance, WhatsApp as snapChat, weChat provided a free communication platform with friends and contacts. The utility to use it relies on the fact that a substantial part of or friends and colleagues are already users.

=== Multi-sided market ===
The Digital market can be labeled a 'multi-sided' market. The notion developed by French Nobel prize laureate Jean Tirole is based on the idea that platforms are 'two-sided'. This can explain why some platforms can offer free content, with customers on one side and the software developers or advertisers on the other. On a market where multiple groups of persons interact through platforms as intermediaries, the decisions of each group affect the outcome of the other group of persons through a positive or negative externality. When the users spend time on a page or click on links, this creates a positive externality for the advertiser displaying a banner there. The digital Multinational enterprises (MNEs) do not collect revenue from the user side but from the advertiser side, thanks to the sale of online advertisement.

== Response ==
Given its expected broad impact, traditional firms are actively assessing how to respond to the changes brought about by the digital economy. For corporations, the timing of their response is of the essence. Banks are trying to innovate and use digital tools to improve their traditional business. Governments are investing in infrastructure. In 2013, the Australian National Broadband Network, for instance, aimed to provide a 1 GB/second download speed fiber-based broadband to 93% of the population over ten years. Digital infrastructure is essential for leveraging investment in digital transformation. According to a survey conducted in 2021, 16% of EU enterprises regard access to digital infrastructure to be a substantial barrier to investment.

Some traditional companies have tried to respond to the regulatory challenge imposed by the Digital economy, including through tax evasion. Due to the immaterial nature of digital activities, these digital multinational enterprises (MNEs) are extremely mobile, which allows them to optimize tax evasion. They can carry out high volumes of sales from a tax jurisdiction. Concretely, governments face MNE fiscal optimization from companies locating their activity in the countries where tax is the lowest. On the other hand, companies can undergo double taxation for the same activity or be confronted with legal and tax vagueness. The Conseil National du Numérique concluded that the shortfall in corporate tax gain for Apple, Google, Amazon, and Facebook was worth approximately 500 million euros in 2012.

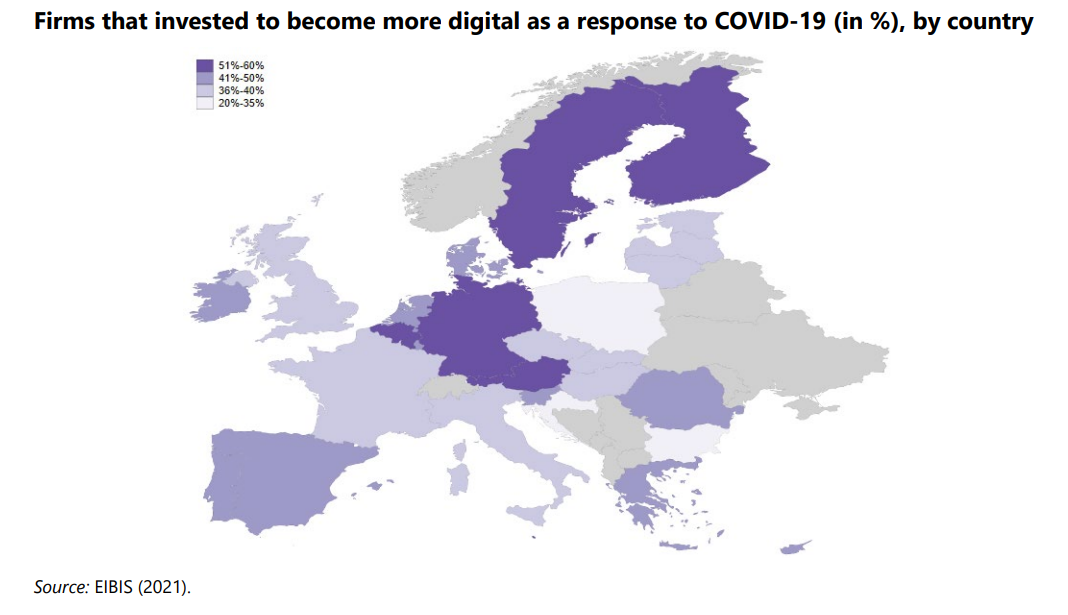
Firms that invested to become more digital as a response to COVID-19, by country

According to 55% of businesses surveyed in the European Investment Bank's Investment survey in 2021, the COVID-19 pandemic has increased the demand for digitalization. 46% of businesses report that they have grown more digital. 34% of enterprises that do not yet utilise advanced digital technology saw the COVID-19 crisis as a chance to focus on digitisation. Firms that have incorporated innovative digital technology are more positive about their industry's and the overall economic condition in the recovery from the COVID-19 pandemic. There is, however, a discrepancy between businesses in more developed locations and less developed regions.

Businesses in poorer regions are more concerned about the pandemic's consequences. Companies in affected areas anticipate long-term effects on their supply chain from the outbreak. A bigger proportion of businesses anticipate permanent employment losses as a result of the digitalization transformation brought on by COVID-19.

During the pandemic, 53% of enterprises in the European Union that had previously implemented advanced digital technology invested more to become more digital. 34% of non-digital EU organizations viewed the crisis as a chance to begin investing in their digital transformation. 38% of firms reported in a survey that they focused on basic digital technologies, while 22% focused on advanced technologies (such as robotics, AI). Organizations that invested in both advanced and basic digital technologies were found most likely to outperform during the pandemic.

After the COVID-19 outbreak, the number of non-digital enterprises that downsized was also greater than the share of non-digital firms that had positive job growth. Non-digital companies had a negative net employment balance. Small and medium-sized businesses are falling behind big and medium-sized businesses. Only 30% of microenterprises in the European Union claimed to have taken action to advance digitalization in 2022, compared to 63% of major businesses. In comparison to 71% in the United States, the proportion of EU enterprises employing advanced digital technology increased from 2021 to 2022, reaching 69%. One in two American businesses (surveyed) and 42% of European businesses increased their investments in digitalization in response to the pandemic in 2022.

In Europe, 31% of people work for companies that are non-digital, compared to 22% of people in the United States. This is also due to the fact that the European Union has many more small businesses than the United States. Smaller businesses are less digital, which has repercussions for the employees they hire. Non-digital enterprises tend to pay lower wages and are less likely to create new employment. They have also been less inclined to train their employees throughout the pandemic. Enterprises in the EU have lower adoption rates for the internet of things than firms in the US. The variations in adoption rates between the European Union and the United States are driven by the lower use of technologies connected to the internet of things.

In Eastern and Central Europe, manufacturing enterprises were the most likely to have implemented various digital technologies (47%) during and after the COVID-19 pandemic, while construction firms were the least likely (14%). Large enterprises (49% versus 27%) were more likely than SMEs to employ various technologies at the same time. Enterprises in these regions excel at robotics (49%), the Internet of Things (42%), and platform implementation (38%).

A cashless society describes an economic state in which transactions no longer use physical currency (such as banknotes and coins) as the medium. Transactions which would historically have been undertaken with cash are often now undertaken electronically.

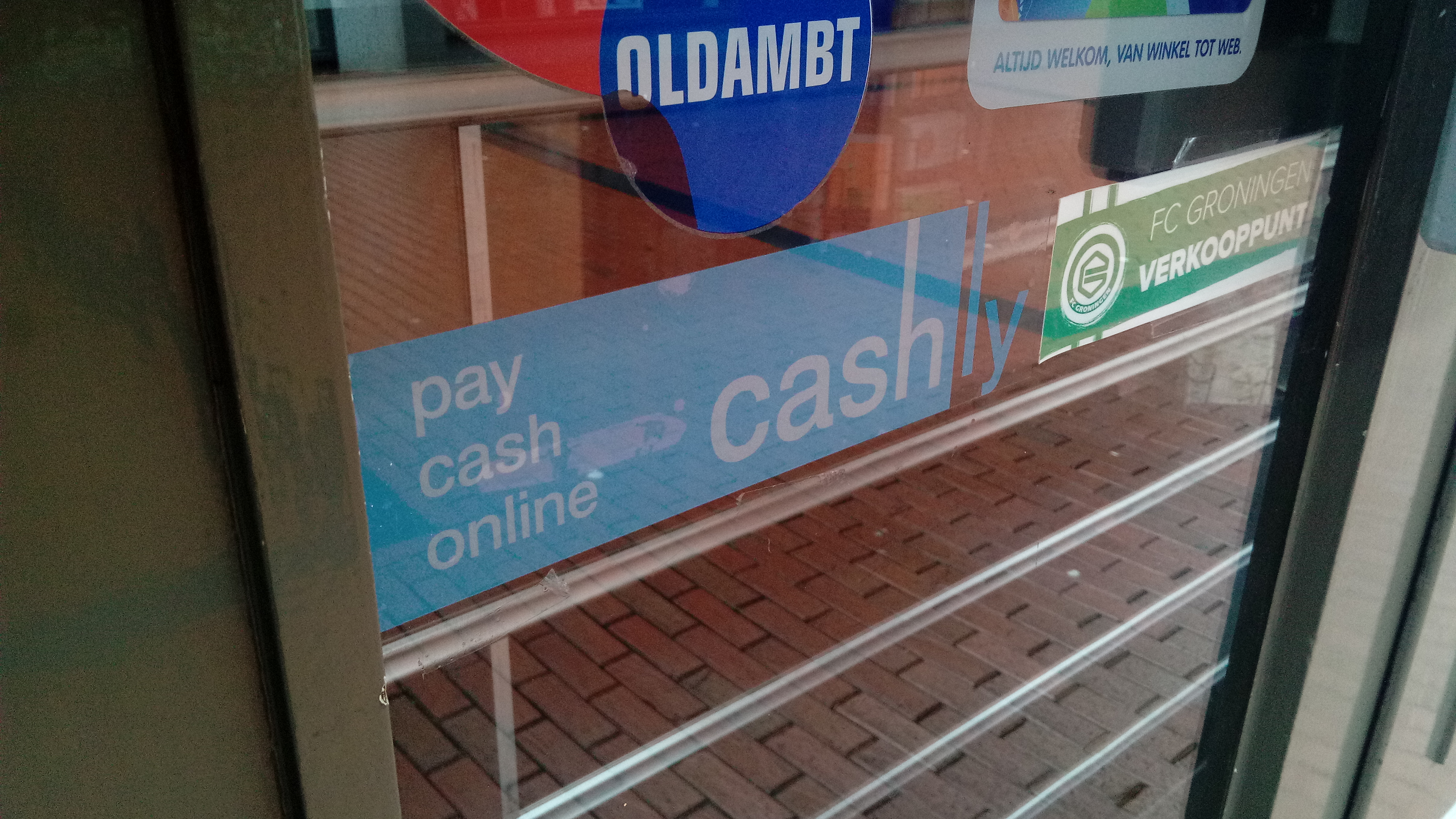
A sign for an online payment service in the Groninger city of Winschoten, Oldambt

== EU digital area ==
=== Remaining barriers to fulfill the Digital Single Market ===
The Digital Single Market (DSM) was included as part of the Single Market Act initiatives adopted by the European Commission (EC). The question had already come up earlier in 1990 and was brought up again later in 2010, emerging at a sensitive moment in the post-crisis of 2008, and used as a catalyst for action. The crisis created opportunities to place the Single Market upfront in the European agenda and was aimed to resolve two issues: financial supervision and economic coordination.

This gave a new dimension to the Market. The proposal for the DSM had been made under the strategy of the Commission entitled "Digital Agenda for Europe" in the political guidelines of the second Barroso Commission and pointed out the need to eliminate barriers in order to implement the European Digital Market as an attempt to relaunch the Single Market. This strategy was similar to the one used for the Internal Market in 1985 and focused on one of the weaknesses of the latter, namely the fragmentation of the national digital market. Building on the Monti report, the communication 'Towards a Single Market Act' detailed 50 proposals to reform the SM by the end of 2012. But the DSM was only adopted in 2015 and the proposal for a directive of the European Parliament and the council was made in September 2016.

The DSM is presented as a key priority in the economy of Union, even if there were several attempts to deepen the integration, there are still obstacles remaining. The creation of the DSM constitutes a catalyst to resolve several issues, and was supposed to have a widespread multiplier effect throughout sectors across the EU. The EU Commission faced several obstacles. The commission acts in a way to deeply transform the Single Market. However, the EC lacked political support to enhance the impact of its decision.

The issue of the low salience was a causal factor explaining the limits of the commission's commitment to reform the single market. Even though the member states approved the DSM, and the definition for the DSM was accepted by European institutions as a key priority, only one proposal was adopted at the end of 2012. Despite being a priority in the SMA I & II, legislative initiatives failed due to the high cost of implementation measures. Also, there were its potential 'blockbuster for economic gains' and the protest of citizens against sovereign debt countries' rescue and bank bail-outs. The slow adoption of the proposal is partly due to member states' protectionist temptations after the economic crisis. Each state wanted to put forward its preferences and legislation concerning this field.

With regard to artificial intelligence (AI), the Commission adopted various initiatives with no meaningful coordination. The more pervasive the digital ecosystem becomes, the more sector-specific regulatory framework may need to be merged into general regimes.

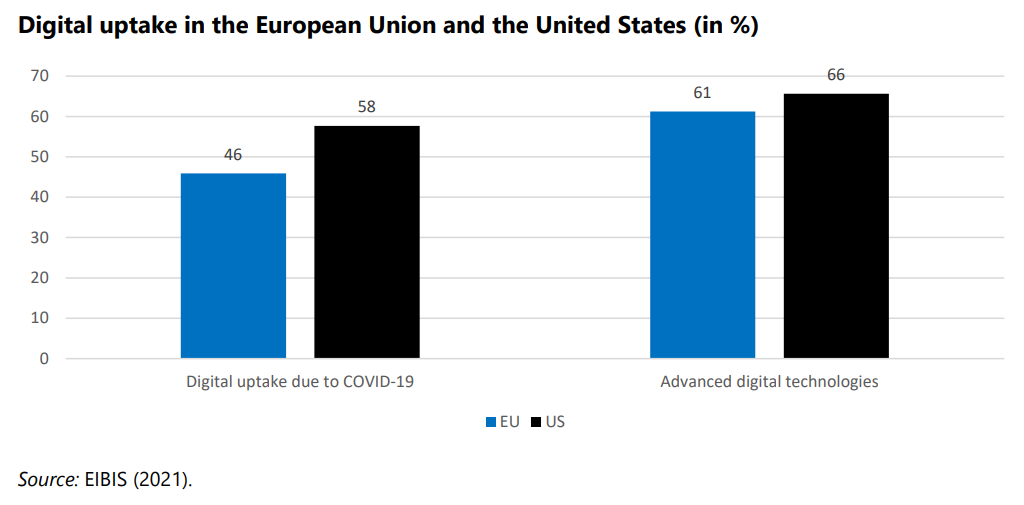
Digital uptake in the European Union and in the United States (in %)

Though the Commission used the crisis as a window of opportunity, it did not allow it to go further in implementing a high transformation of the Single Market. The crisis context pushed the political actors to move forward to better manage the crisis, but did not permit it to fully implement the DSM.

==== Current challenges ====
One of the key priorities of the EU is to guarantee fair competition. Yet, within the Digital Market, the competition may be distorted. With more exertion of network effects comes higher barriers to entry (difficulty for a new entrant to enter the market and compete) in the market. Vertical or horizontal mergers and acquisitions take place in closed ecosystems. In order to limit this problem in the digital ecosystem, the EU aims to qualify certain firms as either as an "abuse of dominant position" or a "cartel" which are against the competition prosperity within the Single Market. Digital companies such as the GAFA prosper thanks to their various free services that they make available to consumers, which appear beneficial for consumers, but less so for firms in potential competition. It my be difficult for regulators to sanction firms such as GAFA, due to the jobs and services they provide worldwide.

==== Challenges for the regulator ====
Certain challenges may exist for regulators. One example is in identifying and defining platforms. Member states lack coordination, and may be independent of the regulator, who can not have a global vision of the market. Also, tax evasion of digital MNEs has become a growing concern for most of the European governments, including the European Commission. Attracting foreign investment is less and less seen as a relevant reason to implement tax cuts. Aside from the fiscal revenue shortfall, this issue has taken a political turn in recent years since some people and politicians feel that, in a time of financial crisis, these highly profitable firms do not contribute to the national effort.

=== Strength within the EU digital policy ===
The Digital Market is characterized by its heterogeneity. The European Market is in a difficult position to compete with other advanced countries within the Digital World (such as US or China). There are currently no European digital champions. The European Digital Market is divided in regulations, standards, usages, and languages. The member states cannot meet the demand, or support innovation (R&D), due to the fact that the digital environment is by nature global. As noted by the European parliament, taxation on Digital Market could bring about 415bn euros to the EU economy, and be considered as an incentive to further deepen the EU integration (EP opinion's 2014).

==== Mechanisms of control ====
The EU controls ex-post (in the case of abuse of dominance for example) and seems to be very cautious in term of concurrence (exclusive competence). The EU sanctions cartels' behavior and examines mergers in order to preserve competition and protect small and medium enterprises (SMEs) entering the market. Within the digital market, mergers often create digital firm dominance, thus possibly preventing European equivalents. Moreover, regulation could, in theory, protect people working in the digital sector or providing services to it, such as Uber drivers, as illustrated by a recent case in France. However, the EU may need to exercise caution when introducing regulation to avoid creating barriers to market entry.

==== European Commission versus Google ====
In 2017, the EC fined Google €2.42 billion for abusing its dominant position as a search engine by giving an illegal advantage to Google Shopping. The EC aimed to pave the way to relieve firms suffering from its abuse of dominant position. Moreover, it sought to prove that the EC's strategy does works and companies may be fined at high rates.

==== Juncker Commission ====
The Digital Economy has been a concern for the Juncker Commission concern since the 1st Barroso Commission. Yet, it is only under the Juncker Commission that the strategy of the DSM was adopted on 6 May 2015 as it was ranked as the second priority out of the 10 priorities for the new Commission's mandate. Throughout this document, the DSM emphasized 3 policy pillars:

1. improving access to digital goods and services,
2. an environment where digital networks and services can prosper,
3. digital as a driver of growth.

As a key priority for the newly President-elect Juncker, he made Andrus Ansip, the vice-president of the commission, in charge of the DSM. The decision to approach the DSM from a different point of view is also because the digital space is in constant evolution with the growing importance of online platform and the change of market share. The DSM was a priority because of its economic importance; the total of EU e-commerce reached 240 billion € in 2011, and out of that 44 billion were cross-border trade between member states.

== Impacts ==
=== Economy ===
According to a 2016 estimate, the Digital Economy represented $11.5 trillion, or 15.5% of global GDP (18.4% of GDP in developed economies and 10 per cent in developing economies on average). It found that the digital economy had grown two and a half times faster than global GDP over the previous 15 years, almost doubling in size since 2000. Most of the value in the digital economy was produced in only a few economies: the United States (35%), China (13%) and Japan (8%). The EU together with Iceland, Liechtenstein and Norway accounted for another 25%.

Some scholars have argued that the digital economy entails unequal economic exchanges where users and consumers provide value to digital firms in the form of data but are not compensated for doing so.

=== Energy ===
The Digital Economy uses a tenth of the world's electricity. The move to the cloud has also caused the rise in electricity use and carbon emissions. A server room at a data center can use, on average, enough electricity to power 180,000 homes. The Digital Economy can be used for mining Bitcoin which, according to Digiconomist, uses an average of 70.69 TWh of electricity per year. The number of households that can be powered using the amount of power that bitcoin mining uses is around 6.5 million in the US.

=== Privacy rights ===
Data gathering and tracking of individual behaviors by digital firms has implications for privacy rights. Data collected on individuals can be analyzed and monetized by technology firms without compensation to users. The data is not only used to predict behaviors, but influence behavior. The data collected is at risk of breaches where personal information can be intentionally or inadvertently exposed.

=== Taxation ===
The digital economy has implications for international tax rules. Digital technology companies produce goods that are not necessarily tied to specific geographical locations, which complicates taxation of those companies. Digital technology can therefore enable tax evasion and tax avoidance.

=== Competition and antitrust ===
The digital economy is characterized by network effects, rapid development of economies of scale, first-mover advantages and winner-takes-all dynamics, which make it possible for a small number of firms to gain a dominant market position and impede entry by potential competitors. These dynamics create concerns about market power, which could enable firms to charge higher prices and pay lower wages than if they experienced competition. Market power could also lead to outsized political influence by dominant technology firms, leading to deregulation. In some cases, digital platform companies can pit their users against governments, thus discouraging stringent regulations.

=== Job displacement and offshoring ===
By increasing automation of tasks previously performed by human workers, the digital economy has the potential to cause job displacement. Whether automation causes net job displacement depends on whether the gains from automation lead to greater consumer demand (by lowering prices for goods and services, and increasing household incomes) and whether the introduction of new labor-intensive tasks will create new jobs.

Digital technology has facilitated the spread of global value chains and made it easier for capital in developed countries to access labor in the developing world, which can lead to greater offshoring and potentially harm low-skilled workers in developed countries.

=== Labor rights ===
The rise of digital platform companies has implications for the nature of work (in particular in the gig economy) and labor rights.

Gig workers are generally classified as 'independent workers' (with temporary, off-site, autonomous contracts) which challenges the application of labor and occupational health and safety law. As a result, online platforms encourage the flexibilization of jobs and a higher volatility of the labor market, as opposed to traditional companies. Gig economy companies such as Deliveroo and Uber hire self-employed drivers who sign a contract with the digital platform while the way they work is similar to a regular employee statute. Yet, for the first time, in March 2020, France's top court (Cour de Cassation) ruling acknowledged that an Uber driver could not qualify as a 'self-employed' contractor because he could not build his clientele or set his prices, establishing a relation of a subordinate of the company.

== See also ==
- Digital culture
- Digital currency
- E-commerce
- Online shopping
- Gross domestic product § Research and development about the relation between GDP and use of GDP and reality
- Knowledge economy
- Cryptoeconomics
