= Third series of the renminbi =

1962 banknote issue by the People's Bank of China

The third series of Renminbi banknotes was introduced since April 15, 1962. Unlike the second series of the renminbi, it did not have a ¥3 banknote and added ¥0.1, ¥0.2, ¥0.5 and ¥1 coins. For the next two decades, the second and third series banknotes were used concurrently. The third series was phased out over the 1990s and then was recalled completely on July 1, 2000, a date valid for all of the denominations with only one date provided.

== Date of issue ==
- April 20, 1962: ¥0.1 (1960 edition) banknote.
- April 15, 1964: ¥2 and ¥0.2 banknotes.
- January 10, 1966: ¥10 and ¥0.1 (1962 edition) banknotes.
- December 15, 1967: ¥0.1 (1962 colour-changing edition) banknote.
- October 20, 1969: ¥1 and ¥5 banknotes.
- January 5, 1974: ¥0.5 banknote.
- April 5, 1980: ¥0.1, ¥0.2, ¥0.5 and ¥1 coins.

== Coins ==
Obverse	Reverse	Value	Technical parameters		Description			Date of		
Obverse	Reverse	Value	Diameter	Composition	Edge	Obverse	Reverse	year	issue	withdrawal
		¥0.01	18 mm	Aluminium-magnesium alloy	Intermittent wire teeth	Wheat, value and year of minting	Emblem of the People's Republic of China	continuing the previous series	continuing the previous series	not withdrawn
		¥0.02	21 mm	Aluminium-magnesium alloy	Intermittent wire teeth	Wheat, value and year of minting	Emblem of the People's Republic of China	continuing the previous series	continuing the previous series	not withdrawn
		¥0.05	24 mm	Aluminium-magnesium alloy	Intermittent wire teeth	Wheat, value and year of minting	Emblem of the People's Republic of China	continuing the previous series	continuing the previous series	not withdrawn
		¥0.1	20 mm	Copper-zinc alloy (brass)	Intermittent wire teeth	Wheat, gear, value and year of minting	Emblem of the People's Republic of China	1980-1986	April 15, 1980	July 1, 2000
		¥0.2	23 mm	Copper-zinc alloy (brass)	Intermittent wire teeth	Wheat, gear, value and year of minting	Emblem of the People's Republic of China	1980-1986	April 15, 1980	July 1, 2000
		¥0.5	26 mm	Copper-zinc alloy (brass)	Intermittent wire teeth	Wheat, gear, value and year of minting	Emblem of the People's Republic of China	1980-1986	April 15, 1980	July 1, 2000
		¥1	30 mm	Cupronickel	Intermittent wire teeth	Value and Great Wall	Emblem of the People's Republic of China and year of minting	1980-1986	April 15, 1980	July 1, 2000
For table standards, see the coin specification table.

== Banknotes ==
Image	Value	Obverse	Reverse	Year	Date of issue	Date of withdrawal	Completely recalled
	¥0.1	Education and production	Emblem of the People's Republic of China and Chrysanthemum flower	1960	April 20, 1962	November 20, 1971	July 1, 2000
	¥0.1	Education and production	Emblem of the People's Republic of China and Chrysanthemum flower	1962 (green at back)	October 31, 1966	December 15, 1967	July 1, 2000
	¥0.1	Education and production	Emblem of the People's Republic of China and Chrysanthemum flower	1962 (brown at back)	December 15, 1967	February 4, 1992	July 1, 2000
	¥0.2	Wuhan Yangtze River Bridge	Emblem of the People's Republic of China and Peony flower	1962	April 15, 1964	February 4, 1992	July 1, 2000
	¥0.5	Textile Factory	Emblem of the People's Republic of China, cotton and plum blossom	1972	January 5, 1974	March 1, 1991	July 1, 2000
	¥1	Female tractor driver (Liang Jun)	Emblem of the People's Republic of China and grazing	1960	October 20, 1969	March 1, 1996	July 1, 2000
	¥2	Lathe worker	Emblem of the People's Republic of China and oil mine	1960	April 15, 1964	March 1, 1991	July 1, 2000
	¥5	Steel worker	Emblem of the People's Republic of China and colliery	1960	October 20, 1969	February 4, 1992	July 1, 2000
	¥10	Members of the National People's Congress	Emblem of the People's Republic of China and Tiananmen	1965	January 10, 1966	March 1, 1996	July 1, 2000

The denominations available with either of these catalog number (issued date-withdrawn date) added:

- ¥0.1 3|1(20/4/1962-20/11/1971), 3|2(31/10/1966-15/12/1967) 3|3(15/12/1967-4/2/1992),
- ¥0.2 (15/4/1964-4/2/1992),
- ¥0.5 (5/1/1974-1/3/1991),
- ¥1 (20/10/1969-1/3/1996),
- ¥2 (15/4/1964-1/3/1991),
- ¥5 (20/10/1969-4/2/1992),
- ¥10 (10/1/1966-1/3/1996).
