= Luo Gongliu =

Chinese painter and printmaker

Luo Gongliu (5 January 1916 – 22 October 2004) (other name: Kung Kiu) was a Chinese painter and printmaker. He was born in the town of Youshan in Guangdong province. He began his career as a woodcut artist and later took up oil painting. He was a member of the Chinese Communist Party (CCP) and depicted the Chinese Communist Revolution in his art. His works are held in the collection of the British Museum, the Met Museum, and the CAFA Art Museum.

Gongliu began his formal education in art in 1936 at the Hangzhou Academy of Art. During the 1950s, he studied oil painting in Leningrad. He became vice president of the Central Academy of Fine Arts in 1979.

Liu's best known works include the oil painting, Chairman Mao Reports on the Rectification at the Cadre Meeting in Yan'an. It depicts Mao speaking at the podium during the Yan'an Rectification Movement.
