= Tokenomics =

Study of how cryptographic tokens create economic value

Tokenomics is the study and analysis of the economic aspects of a cryptocurrency or blockchain project, with a particular focus on the design and distribution of its native digital tokens. The term is a portmanteau of words token and economics.

The term tokenomics emerged in 2026 with a different definition, as the "study of ... tokens (the atomic units of data that large language and multimodal models...)".

== As defined for cryptocurrencies ==
Key areas of interest include determining the value properties of the tokens themselves, and how the properties of tokens (together with other cryptographically secured rules and associated system actions) affect broader economic characteristics of the system including:

- How they provide and distribute scarce resources
- How that system interacts with other external economic processes
- How economic agents behave
- The economic efficiency of all these processes

The field often has a strong applied focus, concerning itself with how to use its insights and principles to engineer economic systems to possess specific, desired properties.

Both cryptocurrency and tokens are the subclasses of digital assets that use the technology of cryptography. Cryptocurrency is the native currency of a blockchain, while tokens are created as part of a platform that is built on an existing blockchain.

Tokens can be created as native elements of a blockchain protocol, or by using a smart contract that is deployed on a blockchain which will host the new token. For example, Ether (ETH) is the native crypto asset of the Ethereum blockchain, and was created by the core Ethereum developer team to incentivise proper maintenance of the blockchain. While Axie Infinity Shards (AXS) tokens, were created using an Ethereum smart contract developed by an unaffiliated third party, in order to give token holders certain governance rights over the game Axie Infinity.

In both cases, different tokenomic attributes are chosen to support the token's intended role. With particular attention typically being paid to tokens' ability to function as an incentive mechanism, and choosing monetary policy that brings token supply into line with its demand. This includes specifying rules about how and when new token should be generated or removed from the system. Rules that are written into smart contracts allow these system processes to be automated.

In the real-world economics system, the economy is subject to fluctuations like inflation and deflation. Central banks intervene through monetary policies. Tokenomics can be thought of as an approach to implementing monetary policies and economic rules via automated smart contracts. On the blockchain, different projects may issue their own tokens with different tokenomics to complete their ecosystem for various purposes, such as fundraising and governance. Some common tokenomics models include the deflationary model, inflationary model, and dual-token model. For instance, before the very last Bitcoin is added to the Bitcoin pool, it is inflationary because as miners (people who find Bitcoin by using algorithms to solve mathematical puzzles) keep mining Bitcoins, the amount of Bitcoins increases and the purchasing power of each Bitcoin decrease. However, the tokenomics of Bitcoin has multiple mechanisms to lower the rate of inflation, such as making mathematical puzzles harder and harder to solve and allowing fewer and fewer miners to receive the coin.

== Creation of tokens and token types ==
Companies may create their own tokens for economic and structural reasons. Tokens are created to encourage the holder to interact with and empower the product by distributing the tokens to their stakeholders as rewards or means of incentivization. Projects may use tokens to raise funds from the public and for proof of internal operation (e.g. game tokens and governance tokens for the right to vote). To achieve the purposes and function of the tokens created, a fine tokenomics structure is needed.

=== Security tokens for fundraising ===
In traditional capital markets, if a company wants to raise funds from the public, it must go through an initial public offering (IPO), which may take years, costing anywhere from $4 to $28 million in fees, depending on its size. In the early stages, only accredited investors are allowed to enter an investment, such as a venture capital. In the decentralized, automated world, with lower cost, tokens can be created by anyone, with fundamental parameters and functions described by tokenomics. Instead of equities, blockchain companies raise funds through the issuing of tokens in the process of initial coin offerings (ICOs). The security tokens can be thought of as equity shares of the blockchain companies. After issuing the tokens, individual investors are allowed to buy tokens and own shares. For investors, they can become early contributors to gain returns along with the growth of the company. Web 3.0 investors can sell their holdings of tokens after the vesting period.

=== Utility tokens for internal use ===
Utility tokens are used as proof to access a company's service or product. Unlike security tokens, utility tokens are for exchange and securing the liquidity and value of the company. Utility tokens are an in-ecosystem currency. For example, with a token named Smooth Love Potion (SLP) in the game Axie Infinity, players can use it to breed desired spirits. In this case, SLP acts as the internal currency within the game. Users earn SLP from tasks, and spend SLP to defeat opponents.

=== Risks ===
Investors risk being "rugged," meaning that the token issuer may "raise money and disappear," resulting in a value loss in those tokens and a capital loss for investors. Hackers may hack into the system and steal the tokens. Another risk could be the bad management of the market from the team and an excessive inflation or deflation of the token itself. Each tokenomics model has its disadvantages and advantages.

== See also ==
- Cryptoeconomics
- Token economy
