= Fen (currency) =

Unit of currency; 1/100th of a yuan

A fen (Chinese: 分; pinyin: fēn) (Cantonese: sin [Chinese: 仙]) is a unit of currency used in Greater China, including the People's Republic of China, the Republic of China (Taiwan), Hong Kong (called a cent in English) and Macao (called an avo in Portuguese). One fen is equal to 1/100 of a yuan or 1/10 of a Chinese jiao.

- Renminbi were issued in coin denominations of 1, 2, and 5 fen and also banknote denominations of 1, 2, and 5 fen. The fen banknotes have stopped circulation since 1 April 2007, while the fen coins are still legal tenders by de jure, but generally limited to interests settlement by banks or exchange of foreign remittances, and rarely used in normal shopping purpose, as shops usually rounded it to jiao (e.g. ¥4.55 is rounded to ¥4.60).
- The character 分 is also used to translate "cent" in other currencies. A euro cent is called 欧分; 歐分; Ōufēn in Chinese.

== See also ==
- Cent (currency)
