= History of the euro =

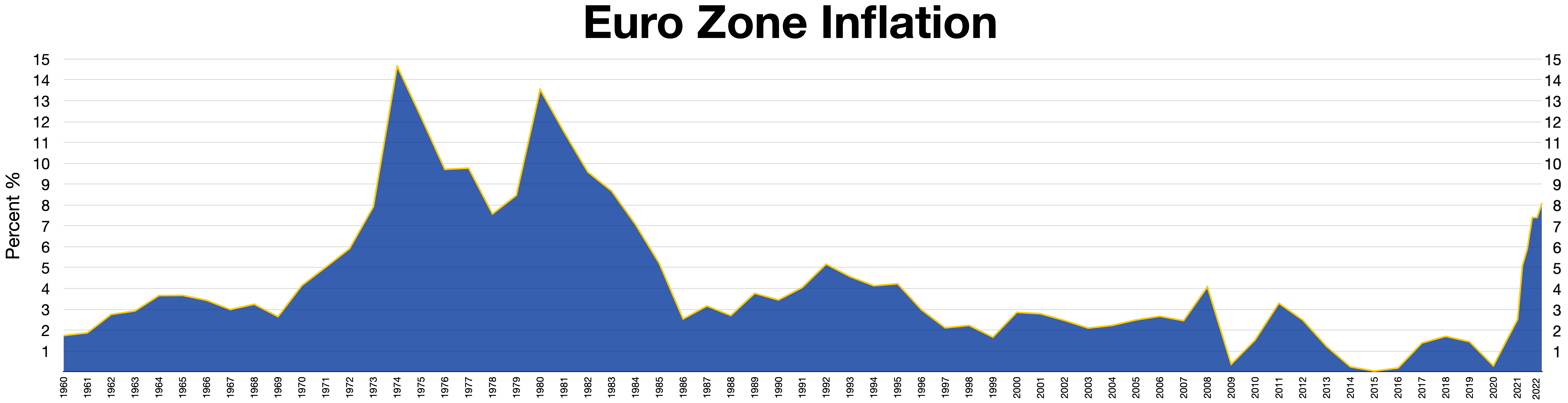
Euro Zone inflation

The euro came into existence on 1 January 1999, although it had been a goal of the European Union (EU) and its predecessors since the 1960s. After tough negotiations, the Maastricht Treaty entered into force in 1993 with the goal of creating an economic and monetary union (EMU) by 1999 for all EU states except the UK and Denmark (even though Denmark has a fixed exchange rate policy with the euro).

The currency was formed virtually in 1999; notes and coins began to circulate in 2002. It rapidly took over from the former national currencies and slowly expanded to the rest of the EU. In 2009, the Lisbon Treaty finalised its political authority, the Eurogroup, alongside the European Central Bank.

== Development ==
=== Early ideas ===
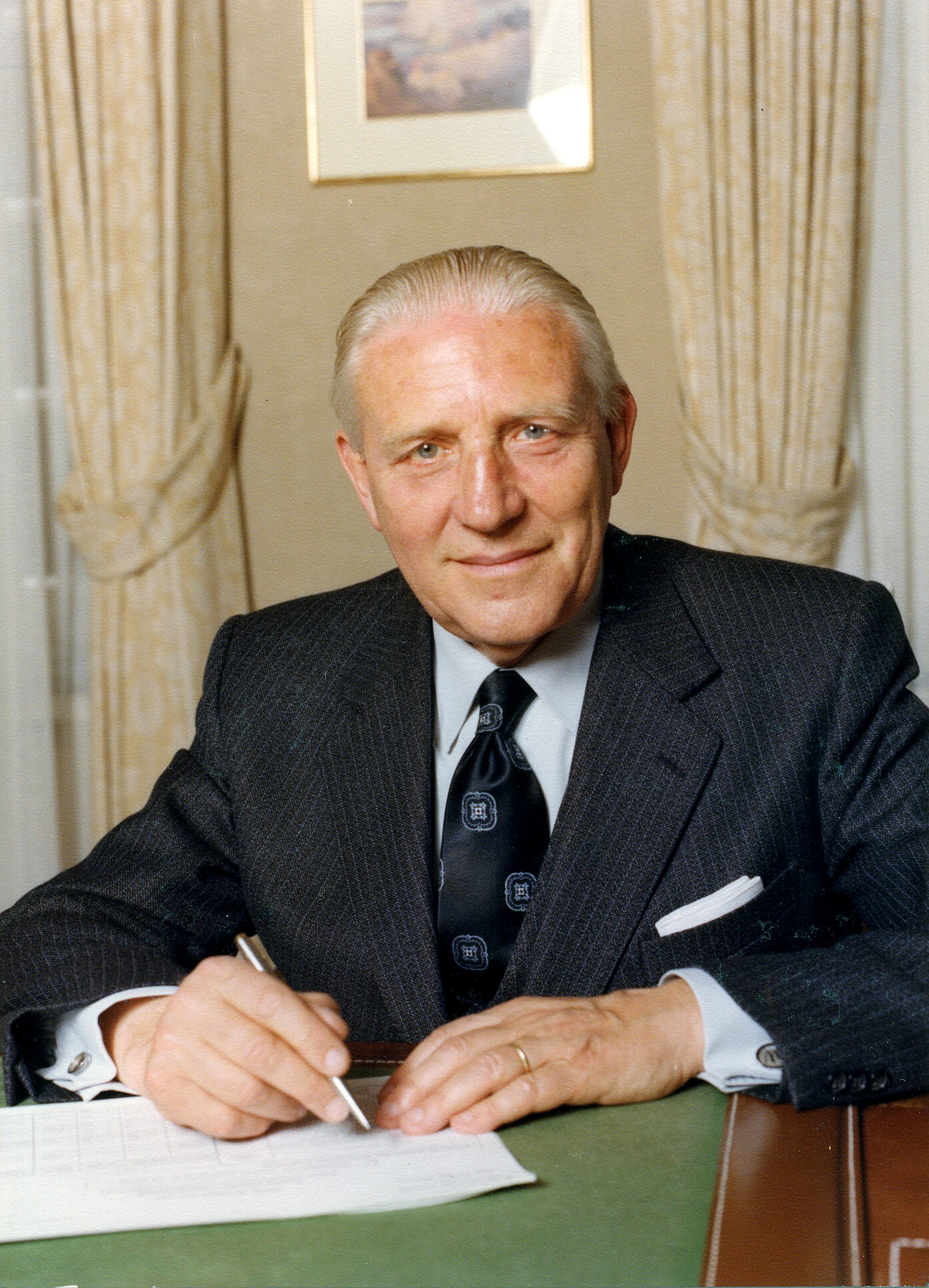
Pierre Werner's report began the first moves towards monetary union.

The first ideas of an economic and monetary union in Europe were raised well before establishing the European Communities. For example, as earlier on as the League of Nations, Gustav Stresemann had enquired in 1929 for a European currency against the background of an increased economic division due to a number of new nation states in Europe after World War I. At this time memories of the Latin Monetary Union involving principally France, Italy, Belgium and Switzerland and which, for practical purposes, had disintegrated following the First World War, figured prominently in the minds of policy makers.

A first attempt to create an economic and monetary union between the members of the European Economic Community (EEC) arrived with an initiative by the European Commission in 1969, which set out the need for "greater co-ordination of economic policies and monetary cooperation". This was followed up at a meeting of the European Council at The Hague in December 1969. The European Council tasked Pierre Werner, Prime Minister of Luxembourg, with finding a way to reduce currency exchange rate volatility. His report was published in October 1970 and recommended centralisation of the national macroeconomic policies entailing "the total and irreversible fixing of parity rates and the complete liberation of movements of capital". But he did not propose a single currency or central bank. An attempt to limit the fluctuations of European currencies, using a snake in the tunnel, failed.

In 1971, the United States Congress removed the gold backing from the US dollar, causing a collapse in the Bretton Woods system that managed to affect all of the world's major currencies. The widespread currency floats and devaluations set back aspirations for EMU. However, in March 1979 the European Monetary System (EMS) was created, fixing exchange rates onto the European Currency Unit (ECU), an accounting currency, to stabilise exchange rates and counter inflation. It also created the European Monetary Cooperation Fund (EMCF).

In February 1986, the Single European Act formalised political co-operation within the EEC, including competency in monetary policy. The European Council summit in Hannover on 14 June 1988 began to outline monetary co-operation. France, Italy and the European Commission backed a fully monetary union with a central bank, which British Prime Minister Margaret Thatcher opposed.

=== Relaunch ===
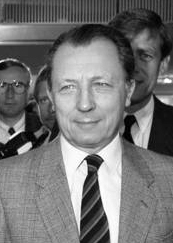
President Jacques Delors's three-point plan laid out the path to EMU.

The Hannover European Council asked Commission President Jacques Delors to chair an ad hoc committee of central bank governors, known as the Delors Committee, to propose a new timetable with clear, practical and realistic steps for creating an economic and monetary union. This way of working was derived from the Spaak method.

France and the UK were opposed to German reunification, and attempted to influence the Soviet Union to stop it. However, in late 1989 France extracted German commitment to the Monetary Union in return for support for German reunification.

The Delors report of 1989 set out a plan to introduce the EMU in three stages and it included the creation of institutions such as the European System of Central Banks (ESCB), which would become responsible for formulating and implementing monetary policy. It laid out monetary union being accomplished in three steps. Beginning the first of these steps, on 1 July 1990, exchange controls were abolished, thus capital movements were completely liberalised in the European Economic Community. Leaders reached agreement on currency union with the Maastricht Treaty, signed on 7 February 1992. It agreed to create a single currency, although without the participation of the United Kingdom, by January 1999.

Gaining approval for the treaty was a challenge. Germany was cautious about giving up its stable currency, i.e., the German Mark, France approved the treaty by a narrow margin and Denmark refused to ratify until they got such an opt-out from monetary union as the United Kingdom, an opt-out that they maintain as of 2024. On 16 September 1992, known in the UK as Black Wednesday, the British pound sterling was forced to withdraw from the fixed exchange rate system due to a rapid fall in the value of the pound.

=== Second stage ===
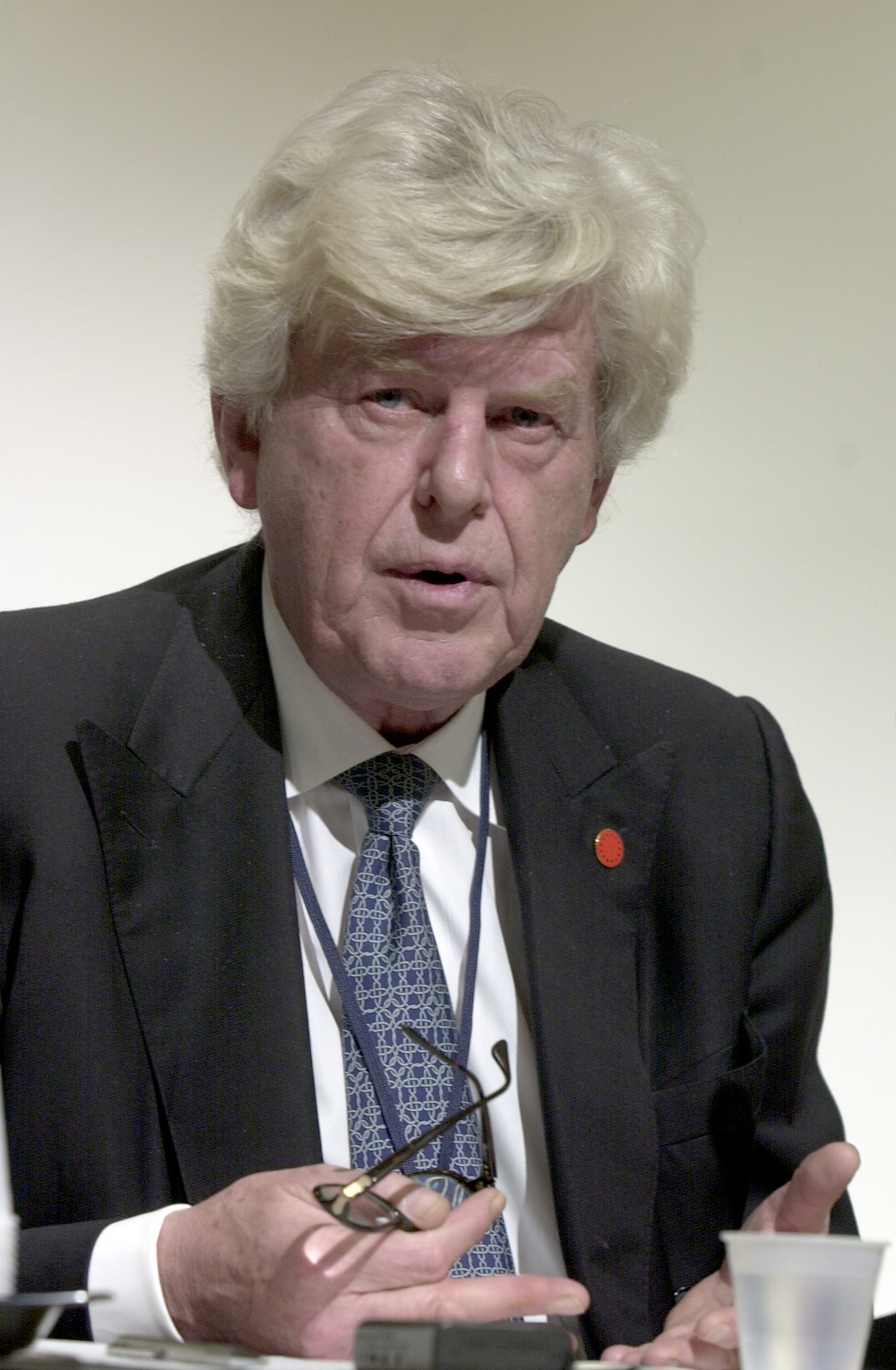
Wim Duisenberg was the first President of the European Central Bank.

Delors' second stage began in 1994 with creation of the European Monetary Institute, succeeding the EMCF, under Maastricht. It was created as the forerunner to the European Central Bank. It met for the first time on 12 January under its first president, Alexandre Lamfalussy. After much disagreement, in December 1995 the name euro was adopted for the new currency (replacing the name Ecu used for the previous accounting currency), on the suggestion of then-German finance minister Theo Waigel. They also agreed on the date 1 January 1999 for its launch.

On 17 June 1997 the European Council decided in Amsterdam to adopt the Stability and Growth Pact, designed to ensure budgetary discipline after creation of the euro, and a new exchange rate mechanism (ERM II) was set up to provide stability above the euro and the national currencies of countries that hadn't yet entered the eurozone. Then, on 3 May 1998, at the European Council in Brussels, the 11 initial countries that would participate in the third stage from 1 January 1999 were selected. To participate in the new currency, member states had to meet strict criteria such as a budget deficit of less than 3% of their GDP, a debt ratio of less than 60% of GDP, low inflation, and interest rates close to the EU average. Greece failed to meet the criteria and was excluded from participating on 1 January 1999.

On 1 June 1998 the European Central Bank succeeded the European Monetary Institute. However, it did not take on its full powers until the euro was created on 1 January 1999. The bank's first President was Wim Duisenberg, former head of the EMI and the Dutch central bank. The conversion rates between the 11 participating national currencies and the euro were then established. The rates were determined by the Council of the European Union, based on a recommendation from the European Commission based on the market rates on 31 December 1998, so that one ECU would equal one euro. These rates were set by Council Regulation 2866/98 (EC), of 31 December 1998. They could not be set earlier, because the ECU depended on the closing exchange rate of the non-euro currencies (principally the pound sterling) that day. Due to differences in national conventions for rounding and significant digits, all conversion between the national currencies had to be carried out using the process of triangulation via the euro.

== Creation ==
=== Launch ===
Eurozone, 1999–2006

The currency was introduced in non-physical form (traveller's cheques, electronic transfers, banking, etc.) at midnight on 1 January 1999, when the national currencies of participating countries (the eurozone) ceased to exist independently in that their exchange rates were locked at fixed rates against each other, effectively making them mere non-decimal subdivisions of the euro. The euro thus became the successor to the European Currency Unit (ECU). The notes and coins for the old currencies, however, continued to be used as legal tender until new notes and coins were introduced on 1 January 2002 (having been distributed in small amounts in the previous December). Starting on 1 January 1999, all bonds and other forms of government debt by eurozone nations were denominated in euros.

The value of the euro, which started at US$1.1686 on 31 December 1998, rose during its first day of trading, Monday, 4 January 1999, closing at approximately US$1.18. It was rapidly taken up and dealers were surprised by the speed at which it replaced the national currencies. Trading in the Deutsche Mark was expected to continue in parallel but vanished as soon as the markets opened. However, by the end of 1999 the euro had dropped to parity with the dollar leading to emergency action from the G7 to support the euro in 2001.

Later in 2000, Denmark held a referendum on whether to abandon their opt-out from the euro. The referendum resulted in a decision to retain the krone, and also set back plans for a referendum in the UK as a result. The procedure used to fix the irrevocable conversion rate of 340.750 between the Greek drachma and the euro was different, since the euro by then was already two years old. While the conversion rates for the initial eleven currencies were determined only hours before the euro was introduced as a virtual currency, the conversion rate for the Greek drachma was fixed several months beforehand, in Council Regulation 1478/2000 (EC) of 19 June 2000.

=== Minting ===
The designs for the new coins and notes were announced between 1996 and 1998, and production began at the various mints and printers on 11 May 1998. The task was large, and would require the full three-and-a-half-years. In all, 7.4 billion notes and 38.2 billion coins would be available for issuance to consumers and businesses on 1 January 2002. In seven nations, the new coins—struck in the run-up to 1 January 2002—would bear a 2002 date. In Belgium, Finland, France, the Netherlands, and Spain, the new coins would bear the date of striking, so those five countries would be the only ones to strike euro coins dated 1999, 2000, and 2001. Small numbers of coins from Monaco, Vatican City, and San Marino were also struck. These immediately became popular collector's items, commanding premiums well above face value. New issues continue to do so to this day.

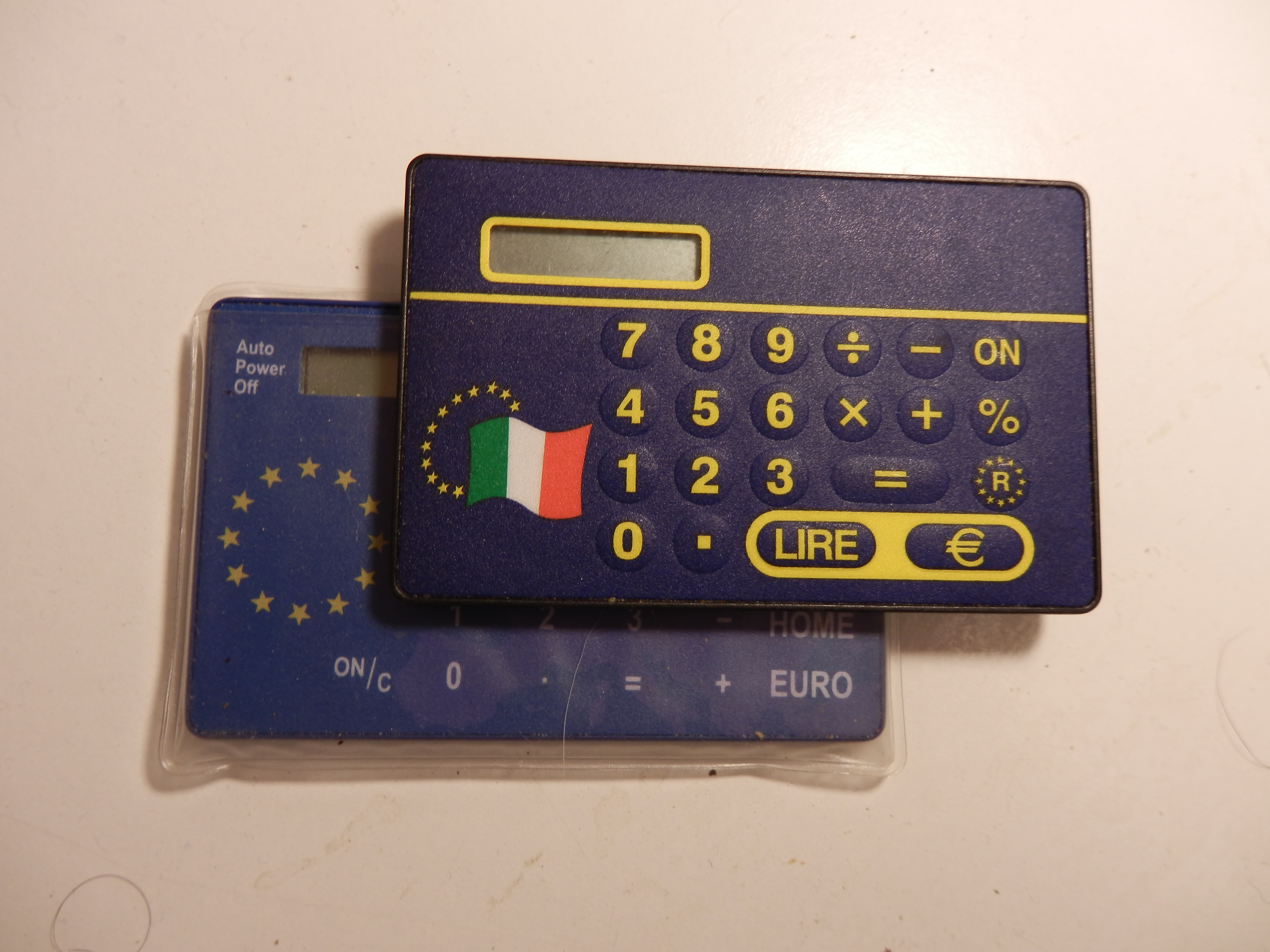
Euro pocket calculators were sold or offered in many countries.

Meanwhile, a parallel task was to educate the European public about the new coins. Posters were issued showing the designs, which were used on items ranging from playing cards to T-shirts. As a final step, on 15 December 2001, banks began exchanging "euro starter kits", plastic pouches with a selection of the new coins in each country (generally, between 10 and 20 euros' worth—though Finland's contained one of each coin, totalling €3.88). They would not be usable in commerce until 1 January, when notes would be made available as well. Larger starter kits, containing a roll of each denomination, were available as well in some nations.

Retailers and government agencies had a considerable task as well. For items to be sold to the public, dual pricing was commonly used. Postage stamps for governments (as well as stamps issued by the United Nations Postal Administration for the UN offices in Vienna) often bore denominations both in the legacy currency and euros, assuring continued utility beyond 2001. Banks bore a huge task, not only in preparation for the change of the notes and coins, but also in the back office. Beginning in 1999, all deposits and loans were technically in euros, but deposits and withdrawals continued in the legacy currency. Statements would bear balances in both currencies beginning no later than 1 July 2001, and earlier if required by the customer's needs.

Starting on 1 December 2001, coins and notes were distributed from secure storage, first to large retailers, and then to smaller ones. It was widely expected that there would be massive problems on and after 1 January. Such a changeover, across twelve populous countries, had never been attempted before.

=== Currency transition ===
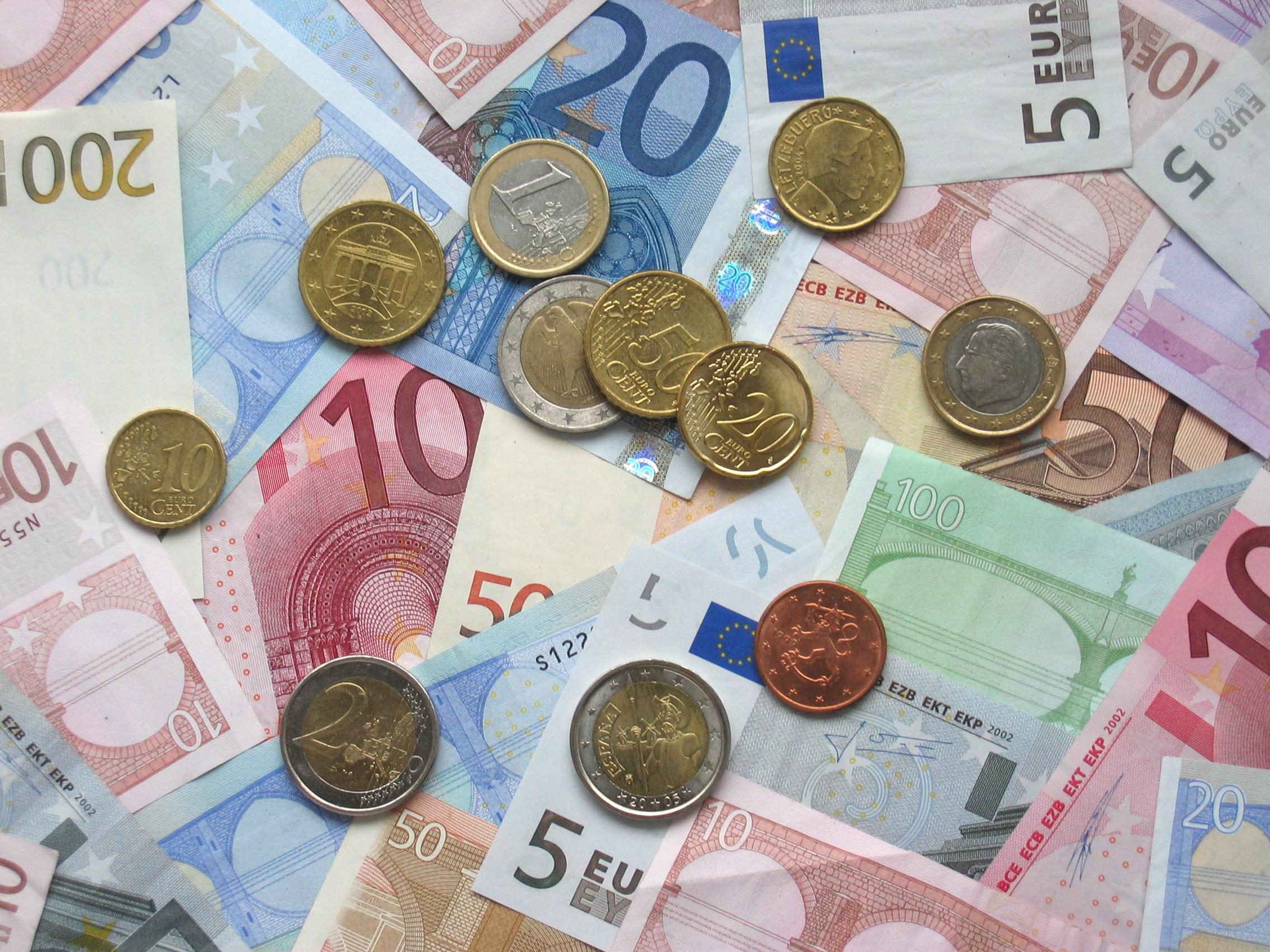
Euro banknotes and coins of various denominations

The new coins and notes were first valid on the French island of Réunion in the Indian Ocean. The first official purchase using euro coins and notes took place there, for one kilogram of lychees. The coming of midnight in Frankfurt at the ECB offices, though, symbolised the transition.

In Finland, the Central Bank opened for an hour at midnight to allow citizens to exchange currency, while a huge euro pyramid decorated Syntagma Square in Athens. Other countries noted the coming of the euro as well—Paris's Pont Neuf was decorated in EU colours, while in the northern German town of Gifhorn a sombre, symbolic funeral for the Deutsche Mark took place.

Except for Germany, the plan for introduction of the new currency was basically the same. Banks would accept the exchange of legacy currencies, begin to dispense euros from ATMs, and only euros would be available as withdrawals were made, starting on 1 January. Merchants would accept legacy currency, but give change only in euros. In Germany, the Deutsche Mark would no longer be a legal tender on 1 January, but would have to be exchanged at the banks.

Despite the massive amounts of euros available, chaos was feared. In France, these fears were accentuated by a threatened postal workers' strike. The strike, however, was settled. Similarly, workers at the French bank BNP Paribas threatened to disrupt the introduction of euro currency with a strike. That was also settled.

Historical currencies of the European Union
Currency	Code	Rate	Fixed on	Yielded
Austrian schilling	ATS	13.7603	31 December 1998	1 January 1999
Belgian franc	BEF	40.3399	31 December 1998	1 January 1999
Dutch guilder	NLG	2.20371	31 December 1998	1 January 1999
Finnish markka	FIM	5.94573	31 December 1998	1 January 1999
French franc	FRF	6.55957	31 December 1998	1 January 1999
German mark	DEM	1.95583	31 December 1998	1 January 1999
Irish pound	IEP	0.787564	31 December 1998	1 January 1999
Italian lira	ITL	1,936.27	31 December 1998	1 January 1999
Luxembourg franc	LUF	40.3399	31 December 1998	1 January 1999
Portuguese escudo	PTE	200.482	31 December 1998	1 January 1999
Spanish peseta	ESP	166.386	31 December 1998	1 January 1999
Greek drachma	GRD	340.750	19 June 2000	1 January 2001
Slovenian tolar	SIT	239.640	11 July 2006	1 January 2007
Cypriot pound	CYP	0.585274	10 July 2007	1 January 2008
Maltese lira	MTL	0.429300	10 July 2007	1 January 2008
Slovak koruna	SKK	30.1260	8 July 2008	1 January 2009
Estonian kroon	EEK	15.6466	13 July 2010	1 January 2011
Latvian lats	LVL	0.702804	9 July 2013	1 January 2014
Lithuanian litas	LTL	3.45280	23 July 2014	1 January 2015
Croatian kuna	HRK	7.53450	12 July 2022	1 January 2023
Bulgarian lev	BGN	1.95583	8 July 2025	1 January 2026

In practice, the roll-out was smooth, with few problems. By 2 January, all ATMs in 7 countries and at least 90 percent in 4 others were issuing euros rather than legacy currency, with Italy, the worst offender, having only 85% of ATMs dispensing euros. The unexpected tendency of consumers to spend their legacy currency, rather than exchange it at banks, led to temporary shortages of euro small change, with some consumers being given change in legacy currency.

Some businesses did take advantage of the currency exchange to raise prices. According to a study by the Deutsche Bundesbank, there was a price rise, but consumers refused to buy as much. A coffee bar in Italy that took advantage of the transition to raise coffee prices by a third was ordered to pay compensation to customers.

=== Aftermath ===
Nations were allowed to keep legacy currency in circulation as legal tender for two months, until 28 February 2002. The official date on which the national currencies ceased to be legal tender varied from member state to member state. The earliest date was in Germany; the Deutsche Mark officially ceased to be legal tender after 31 December 2001. Most member states, though, permitted their legacy currency to remain in circulation the full two months. The legacy currency was exchangeable at commercial banks in the currency's nation for a further period, generally until 30 June 2002.

However, even after the official dates, they continued to be accepted for exchange by national central banks for varying periods—and indefinitely in Austria, Germany, Ireland, and Spain. Coins from those four countries and Finland remain exchangeable. The earliest coins to become non-convertible were the Portuguese escudos, which ceased to have monetary value after 31 December 2002, although banknotes remained exchangeable until 2022. All banknotes current on 1 January 2002 would remain valid until at least 2012.

In Germany, Deutsche Telekom modified 50,000 pay phones to take Deutsche Mark coins in 2005, at least on a temporary basis. Callers were allowed to use DM coins, at least initially, with the Deutsche Mark pegged to equal one euro, almost twice the usual rate.

In France, as of 2007 receipts still indicated the value of products in the legacy currency (francs) along with the euro value. In other eurozone countries this had long been considered unnecessary. As of 2008, some small-town merchants in France still accepted franc notes.

Euro usage in the world (blue and purple, click for detail)

=== Early growth ===
After dropping to an interday low of US$0.8296 on 26 October 2001, and a brief crash to $0.8115 on 15 January 2002, the euro soon recovered from its early slump. Its value last closed below $1.00 on 28 September 2022 ($0.95361), and increased in value from there. It peaked at $1.35 in 2004, and reached its highest value versus the US dollar at $1.5916 on 14 July 2008. As its values increased against the pound sterling in the late-2000s, peaking at 97.73p on 31 December 2008, its international usage grew rapidly. The euro grew in importance steadily, with its share of foreign exchange reserves rising from nearly 18% in 1999 to 25% in 2003—while the dollar share fell by an equivalent margin. Alan Greenspan in 2007 said the eurozone had profited from the euro's rise and claimed it was perfectly conceivable that it could trade equally or become more important than the US dollar in the future.

=== Public support ===
Public support for the euro in each state between 2001 and 2006.

== Recession era ==
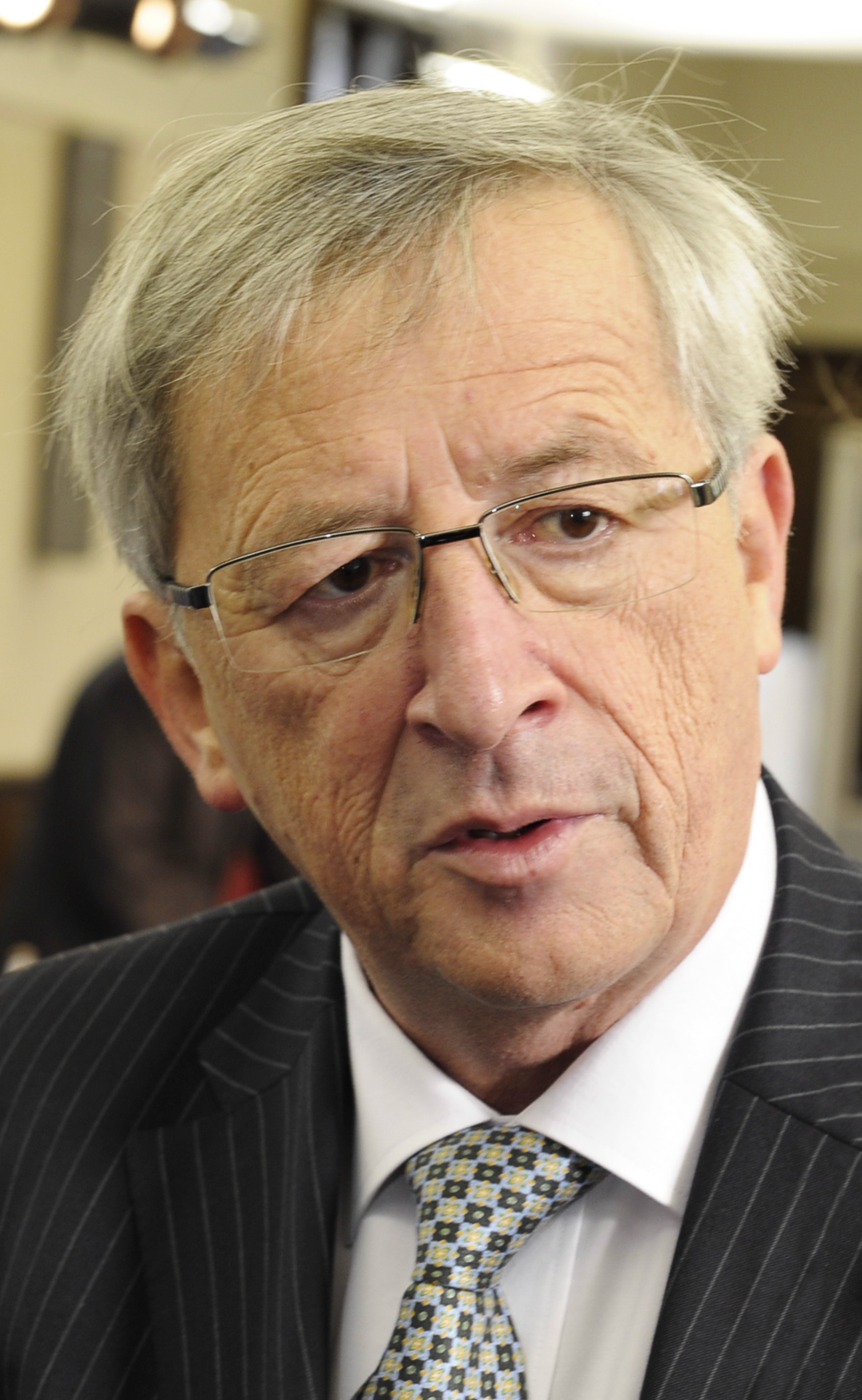
The Lisbon Treaty formalised Jean-Claude Juncker's post as President of the Eurogroup.

Due to the 2008 financial crisis and the Great Recession, the eurozone entered its first official recession in the third quarter of 2008, official figures confirmed in January 2009. The EU was in negative growth for the second, third and fourth quarters of 2008 and the first quarter of 2009 before returning to positive growth (for the eurozone as a whole). Despite the recession, Estonia acceded to the eurozone and Iceland put in an EU application to join the euro, seeing it at the time as a safe haven.

=== Lisbon Treaty ===
In 2009, the Lisbon Treaty formalised the Eurogroup, the meeting of euro finance ministers, with an official president. Jean-Claude Juncker served as president before and after formalisation and has been an advocate of strengthening the group, economic co-operation and common representation. Appetite for stronger economic co-operation grew due to the recession and the potential failure of some weaker eurozone members. However, Germany had opposed previous moves to strengthen the Eurogroup, such as French President Nicolas Sarkozy's attempts at Eurogroup summits, due to fears of undermining the ECB's independence. Jean-Claude Trichet, who succeeded Duisenberg as ECB president in 2003, fended off numerous attacks from Sarkozy at the start of the recession. Before that formalisation of the Eurogroup, eurozone leaders held an extraordinary summit on 11 October 2008 in Paris to discuss the 2008 financial crisis. Rather than the Eurogroup meeting as finance ministers, they met as head of states or government (similar to the European Council) to define a joint action plan for the eurozone and the European Central Bank to stabilise the European economy. These such meetings would be where many euro governance reforms would be agreed.

=== Early responses ===
The leaders designed a plan to mitigate the 2008 financial crisis which will involve hundreds of billions of euros of new initiatives to head off a feared meltdown. They agreed a bank rescue plan: governments would buy into banks to boost their finances and guarantee interbank lending. Coordination against the crisis is considered vital to prevent the actions of one country harming another and exacerbating the bank solvency and credit shortage problems.

Despite initial fears by speculators in early 2009 that the stress of such a large recession could lead to the break-up of the eurozone, the euro's position actually strengthened as the year progressed. Far from the poorer performing economies moving further away and becoming a default risk, bond yield spreads between Germany and the weakest economies decreased easing the strain on these economies. Much of the credit for the turn around in fortunes has been attributed to the ECB, which injected €500bn into the banks in June. Indeed, the euro came to be seen as a safe haven, as countries outside it such as Iceland fared worse than those with the euro. Iceland subsequently applied to the EU to get the benefit of using a larger currency with the support of the ECB.

=== Bailout funds ===
However, with the risk of a default in Greece and other members in late 2009–10, eurozone leaders agreed to provisions for bailing out member states who could not raise funds (triggered for Greece in April 2010). This was a U-turn on the EU treaties, which rule out any bailout of a euro member to encourage members to manage their finances better. Yet with Greece struggling to restore its finances, other member states also at risk and the repercussions this would have on the rest of the eurozone economy; a temporary bail out mechanism was agreed and devised in the form of a special-purpose vehicle (SPV) named "European Financial Stability Facility" (complemented by the European Financial Stabilisation Mechanism and funds form the International Monetary Fund), aiming at preserving financial stability in Europe by providing financial assistance to eurozone states in difficulty. The crisis also spurred consensus for further economic integration and a range of proposals such as a "European Monetary Fund" or federal treasury.

However, in June 2010, broad agreement was finally reached on a controversial proposal for member states to peer review each other's budgets prior to their presentation to national parliaments. Although showing the entire budget to each other was opposed by Germany, Sweden and the UK, each government would present to their peers and the Commission their estimates for growth, inflation, revenue and expenditure levels six months before they go to national parliaments. If a country was to run a deficit, they would have to justify it to the rest of the EU while countries with a debt more than 60% of GDP would face greater scrutiny. The plans would apply to all EU members, not just the eurozone, and have to be approved by EU leaders along with proposals for states to face sanctions before they reach the 3% limit in the Stability and Growth Pact. Poland has criticised the idea of withholding regional funding for those who break the deficit limits, as that would only impact the poorer states. In June 2010 France agreed to back Germany's plan for suspending the voting rights of members who breach the rules.

In late 2010/early 2011, it was agreed to replace the European Financial Stability Facility and European Financial Stability Mechanism with a larger and permanent European Stability Mechanism (ESM). The ESM required a treaty amendment to allow it and a separate treaty to establish it but, if ratified successfully, would be established in time to take over when the old facilities expire in 2013. Meanwhile, to support Italy and prevent it having to ask for a bail-out later, the ECB controversially started buying Italian bonds, as it had done with Greece.

=== Fiscal agreements ===
In March 2011 was initiated a new reform of the Stability and Growth Pact aiming at straightening the rules by adopting an automatic procedure for imposing of penalties in case of breaches of either the deficit or the debt rules. The Euro Plus Pact sets out a wide range of reforms to take place in the eurozone to ensure and the French and German governments further agreed to push for a 'true economic government' that would involve twice-yearly eurozone leader summits and a financial transactions tax.

The European Fiscal Union is a proposal for a treaty about fiscal integration described in a decision adopted on 9 December 2011 by the European Council. The participants are the eurozone member states and all other EU members without the United Kingdom and the Czech Republic. The treaty entered into force on 1 January 2013 for the 16 states which completed ratification prior of this date and on 1 April 2014 entered into force for all 25 signatories.

=== Enlargements ===
Eurozone participation European Union member states (special territories not shown) 21 in the eurozone 1 in ERM II, with an opt-out (Denmark) 5 not in ERM II, but committed to join the eurozone after meeting the convergence criteria (Czech Republic, Hungary, Poland, Romania, and Sweden) Non–EU member states 4 using the euro with a monetary agreement (Andorra, Monaco, San Marino, and Vatican City) 2 using the euro unilaterally (Kosovo and Montenegro)

Despite speculation that the crisis in Greece could spread and that the euro might fail, some newer EU states from the 2004 enlargement joined the currency during the recession. Slovenia joined in 2007. Malta and Cyprus joined in 2008. Slovakia joined in 2009. Estonia joined in 2011. Latvia joined in 2014. Lithuania joined in 2015. Croatia joined in 2023, and Bulgaria joined in 2026.

==== Slovenia ====
Slovenia was the first country to join the eurozone after the launch of the coins and banknotes. Participation in ERM II began on 28 June 2004 and on 11 July 2006 the Council of EU adopted a decision allowing Slovenia to join the euro area as from 1 January 2007, becoming the first nation from the former Socialist Federal Republic of Yugoslavia to do so. The euro replaced the Slovenian tolar on 1 January 2007. The exchange rate between the euro and tolar had been set on 11 July 2006 at 239.640 SIT, but unlike the previous launches, cash and non-cash transactions were introduced simultaneously.

==== Cyprus ====
Cyprus replaced the Cypriot pound with the euro on 1 January 2008.

A formal letter of application to join the eurozone was submitted on 13 February 2007. On 16 May 2007 the European Commission, backed by the European Central Bank, gave its go-ahead for the introduction in January 2008.

The campaign to inform the citizens of Cyprus about the euro officially began in Cypriot media on 9 March 2007. On 15 March 2007, the Cypriot House of Representatives passed the necessary laws for the introduction of the euro on 1 January 2008. The European Commissioner for Economic & Financial Affairs Joaquín Almunia, on 16 May 2007, recommended that Cyprus adopt the euro as scheduled, and the European Parliament concurred on 21 June 2007; the date was confirmed by the EU leaders. The final decision was taken by the EU finance ministers (Ecofin) on 10 July 2007 and the conversion rate was fixed at 0.585274 CYP. On 23 October 2007, the coin designs were officially published in the Official Journal of the European Union.

On 1 January 2008, the euro replaced the Cypriot pound as the official currency. The euro is only used in the government-controlled areas of the Republic, the Sovereign Base Areas of Akrotiri and Dhekelia (under UK jurisdiction, outside the EU) and in the United Nations Buffer Zone in Cyprus. The de facto Turkish Republic of Northern Cyprus continues to use the new Turkish lira as its primary currency and the euro as its secondary currency.

==== Malta ====
Valletta covered with floor designs of their new euro coins

Malta replaced the Maltese lira with the euro on 1 January 2008. The aims were officially confirmed on 26 February 2007. On 16 May 2007, the Commissioner for Economic & Financial Affairs of the EU, Joaquín Almunia, recommended that Malta adopt the euro as scheduled, a decision later confirmed by the Council of Finance Ministers of 10 July 2007. On the same day, dual displaying became mandatory and the first Maltese euro coins were struck at Monnaie de Paris. The first Maltese euro coins were available for the public on 1 December 2007, as business starter packs worth €131 each started being available for small businesses to fill up their cash registers with sufficient amount of euro coins before the €-day (Jum €). Mini-kits each worth €11.65 were available for the general public on 10 December 2007. Maltese coins which were current at the time of the euro transition could be exchanged through 1 February 2010.

Maltese citizens could obtain euro information directly from their town or village between December 2007 and January 2008. From the Euro Centres (Ċentru l-ewro) which opened during the day. People trained specifically on matters related to the changeover to the euro were available to provide council at euro centres along with information materials.

In December 2007, as part of the euro changeover celebrations, streets of Valletta were covered with carpets depicting euro coins. Celebrations reached climax on New Year's Eve with a firework display near the Grand Harbour area, several other activities had to be moved indoors because of the stormy weather that struck the island on that night.

==== Slovakia ====
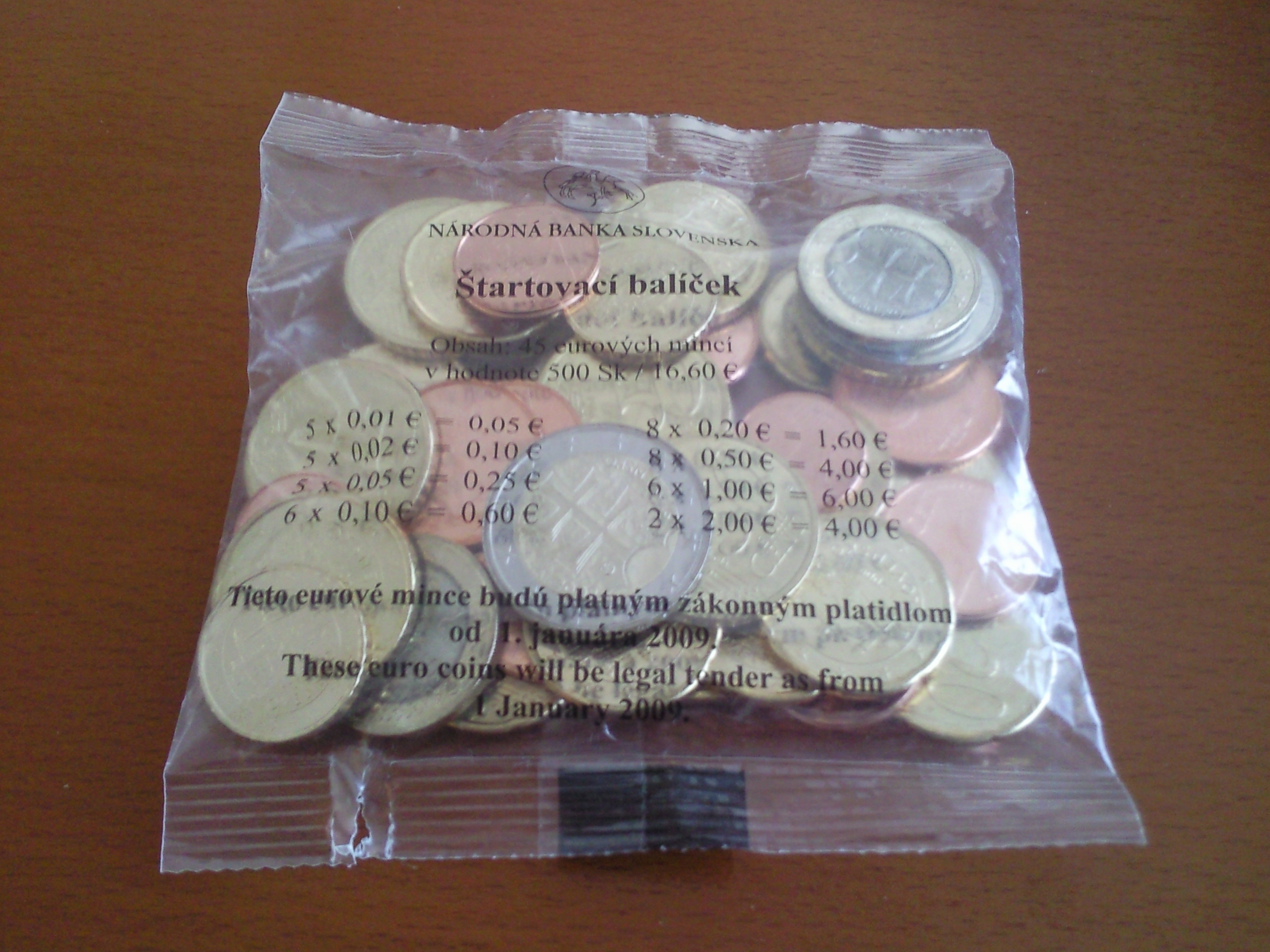
Slovak euro coins starting set

Slovakia adopted the euro on 1 January 2009. The Slovak koruna was part of ERM II from 28 November 2005, requiring that it trade within 15% of an agreed central rate; this rate was changed on 17 March 2007 and again on 28 May 2008. The rate of 30.1260 SKK from May 2008 was finally confirmed on 8 July 2008.

To assist the process of conversion to the euro, on 1 April 2008, the National Bank of Slovakia (NBS) announced their plan for withdrawal of the Slovak koruna notes and coins. A few days later, on 5 April 2008, Slovakia officially applied to enter the eurozone. On 7 May 2008, the European Commission approved the application and asked member states to endorse the bid during the EU finance ministers' meeting in July 2008.

Slovakia fulfilled the euro convergence criteria. At 2.2%, Slovakia's twelve-month inflation was well below the 3.2% threshold. However, for March 2008 annual inflation was 3.6%. Fiscal deficit was 2.2% versus the reference value of 3.0%. Finally, the government debt ratio was 29.4% of GDP in 2007, well below the maximum ratio of 60.0%. Public opinion supported the switch, with 58% in favour and 35% opposed, but 65% worried about the inflationary impacts of the adoption. Three months after the adoption of the currency, 83 per cent of Slovaks considered Slovakia's decision to adopt the euro to have been right.

Publicity for the transition from the koruna to the euro on 1 January 2009 included a "euromobile", with a professional actor driving around the countryside holding impromptu quiz shows about the euro. Winners received euro T-shirts, euro conversion calculators, and chocolate euro coins. Euro starter kits, available for 500 koruna, were a popular Christmas gift in 2008. The coins therein, however, were not valid as legal tender in the eurozone until 1 January 2009, with koruna exchanged through 17 January 2009, though redeemable at the central bank in Bratislava until a date to be determined. Anyone using Slovak euro coins before 1 January could have been fined. Businesses using the transition to raise prices also were subject to penalty.

=== Estonia ===
In 2010, Estonia gained the support of the European Commission, European Central Bank and European Parliament for accession on 1 January 2011, with Estonia adopting the currency on that date and becoming the first nation from the former Soviet Union to do so.

=== Latvia ===
In 2013, Latvia gained the support of the European Commission, European Central Bank and European Parliament for accession on 1 January 2014, with Latvia adopting the currency on that date.

=== Lithuania ===
On 23 July 2014 Lithuania became the last Baltic state to gain permission to join the euro, which was adopted on 1 January 2015.

=== Croatia ===
Croatia adopted the euro on 1 January 2023, making it the 20th member state of the eurozone.

Croatia completed its plans to adopt the Euro Currency as soon as possible after the 1 July 2013 EU accession. The country commenced participation in the ERM II on 10 July 2020 and on 12 July 2022 the Council of EU adopted a currency decision allowing Croatia to join the eurozone from the 1 January 2023. The euro replaced the Croatian kuna on 1 January 2023. The exchange rate between the euro and kuna had been set on 12 July 2022 at 7.5345 HRK and similar to the previous launch of Slovenia, cash and non-cash transactions were introduced simultaneously on the same day and date the country also entered the Schengen Area.

=== Bulgaria ===
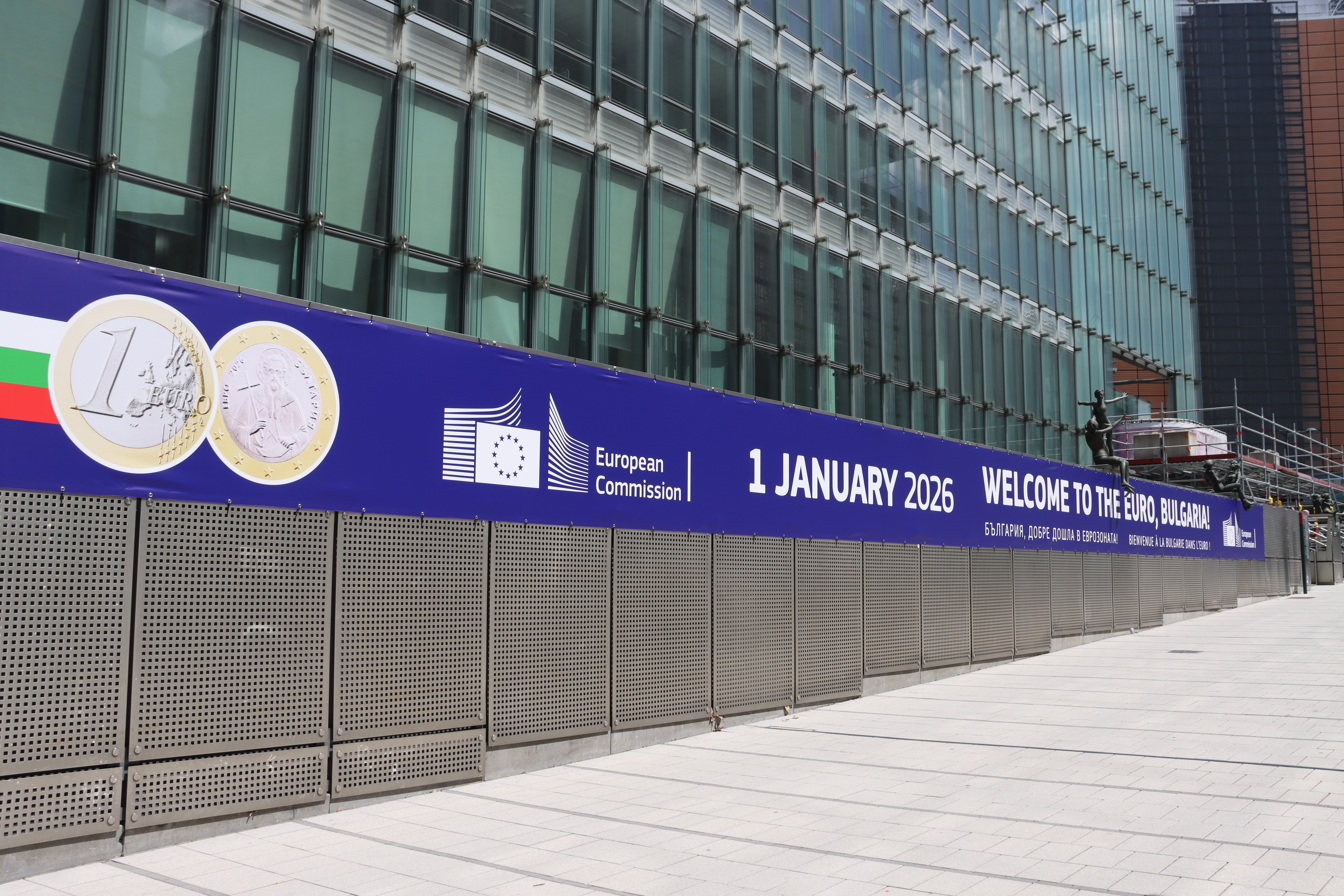
"Welcome to the euro, Bulgaria!" sign at the EU Commission on 8 July 2025, Brussels

Bulgaria adopted the euro on 1 January 2026, making it the 21st member state of the eurozone.

When Bulgaria joined the EU in 2007 it committed to join the eurozone and replace its currency, the lev, with the euro. In February 2025, the country officially requested off-cycle assessments of their convergence by the European Commission and ECB to determine the country's readiness. The 2025 convergence reports published on 4 June 2025 concluded that Bulgaria met the convergence criteria. On 8 July 2025, the European Parliament endorsed Bulgaria's entry in the eurozone and the Council of the European Union adopted the final three legislative acts required for the admission.

=== Public opinion ===
Public support for the euro in each state from the start of the financial crisis in 2007 to Lithuania's accession in 2015

View source data.

== Overview of eurozone enlargements and exchange-rate regimes for EU members ==
The chart below provides a full summary of all applying exchange-rate regimes for EU members, since the European Monetary System with its Exchange Rate Mechanism and the related new common currency ECU was born on 13 March 1979. The euro replaced the ECU 1:1 at the exchange rate markets, on 1 January 1999. During 1979–1999, the D-Mark functioned as a de facto anchor for the ECU, meaning there was only a minor difference between pegging a currency against ECU and pegging it against the D-mark.

Sources: EC convergence reports 1996-2014, Italian lira, Spanish peseta, Portuguese escudo, Finnish markka, Greek drachma, Sterling

The eurozone was established with its first 11 member states on 1 January 1999. The first enlargement of the eurozone, to Greece, took place on 1 January 2001, one year before the euro physically entered into circulation. The next enlargements were to states which joined the EU in 2004, and then joined the eurozone on 1 January of the year noted: Slovenia in 2007, Cyprus and Malta in 2008, Slovakia in 2009, Estonia in 2011, Latvia in 2014, and Lithuania in 2015. Croatia, which joined the EU in 2013, adopted the euro in 2023; while Bulgaria, which joined in 2007, adopted the euro in 2026.

All new EU members having joined the bloc after the signing of the Maastricht Treaty in 1992, are obliged to adopt the euro under the terms of their accession treaties. However, the last of the five economic convergence criteria which needs first to be complied with to qualify for euro adoption, is the exchange rate stability criterion, which requires having been an ERM-member for a minimum of two years without the presence of "severe tensions" for the currency exchange rate.

In September 2011, a diplomatic source close to the euro adoption preparation talks between the seven remaining new Member States from Eastern Europe who had yet to adopt the euro (Bulgaria, Czech Republic, Hungary, Latvia, Lithuania, Poland and Romania), claimed that the monetary union (eurozone) they had thought they were going to join upon their signing of the accession treaty may very well end up being a very different union entailing much closer fiscal, economic and political convergence. This changed legal status of the eurozone could potentially cause them to conclude that the conditions for their promise to join were no longer valid, which "could force them to stage new referendums" on euro adoption.

== Public support ==
Percentage of respondents supporting the euro in each country, according to the Standard Eurobarometer
Member State or Candidate	Joined Eurozone	55 – April 2001	56 – October 2001	57 – March 2002	58 – October 2002	59 – March 2003	60 – October 2003	61 – February 2004	62 – October 2004	63 – May 2005	64 – October 2005	65 – March 2006	66 – September 2006	67 – April 2007	68 – September 2007	69 – March 2008	70 – October 2008	71 – June 2009	72 – October 2009	73 – May 2010	74 – November 2010	75 – May 2011	76 – November 2011	77 – May 2012	78 – November 2012	79 – May 2013	80 – November 2013	81 – May 2014	82 – November 2014	83 – May 2015	84 – November 2015	85 – May 2016	86 – November 2016	87 – May 2017	88 – November 2017	89 – March 2018	90 – November 2018	91 – August 2021
Austria	1999	59	68	72	75	72	67	68	73	65	67	60	67	67	68	66	74	71	71	64	68	63	58	65	66	65	65	67	69	63	62	69	62	68	69	67	70	73
Belgium	1999	75	72	82	81	85	81	83	89	84	83	82	85	84	82	84	82	83	78	78	79	82	80	75	69	76	74	78	76	75	79	77	76	78	81	82	84	92
Bulgaria	2026							74	67	63	65	62	66	64	57	68	61	60	59	55	54	57	50	54	46	44	51	41	45	43	37	42	38	39	39	35	35	42
Croatia	2023								63	59	61	59	63	68	66		65	63	59	67	67	64	63	62	52	61	57	53	56	56	56	54	52	51	43	46	40	45
Cyprus	2008							65	59	53	46	46	43	50	46	58	58	67	63	57	63	55	55	52	48	47	44	53	51	44	49	53	52	60	67	69	74	74
Czech Republic	—N/a							56	60	63	60	57	60	60	53	53	53	51	55	36	41	28	22	24	22	25	26	24	25	22	20	21	25	20	22	23	21	33
Denmark	—N/a	40	47	52	55	53	52	50	50	50	50	50	53	54	52	51	51	53	53	42	43	41	29	28	30	32	33	29	34	31	30	29	30	29	31	29	30	30
Estonia	2011							46	55	59	53	48	49	54	54	56	58	31	63	57	63	71	64	71	69	73	76	80	83	83	82	78	81	83	84	88	85	89
Finland	1999	67	63	64	66	75	70	73	79	77	79	75	78	81	77	80	82	83	81	77	64	77	71	74	76	75	75	76	75	78	74	76	78	77	75	76	82	77
France	1999	49	63	67	71	75	68	68	78	76	78	70	76	72	74	71	73	73	69	65	69	69	63	69	69	62	63	68	67	68	67	70	68	72	71	70	72	74
Germany	1999	53	60	67	62	70	60	58	69	59	66	63	66	72	69	69	71	69	66	62	67	63	66	65	69	66	71	75	74	76	73	73	81	83	81	83	81	82
Greece	2001	72	79	80	71	70	64	64	62	49	46	51	49	47	51	51	58	62	63	64	64	60	75	75	65	60	62	69	63	69	70	62	68	64	66	69	67	73
Hungary	—N/a							63	60	64	64	66	61	67	65	63	63	63	66	67	71	61	54	47	50	50	55	53	54	55	49	51	52	52	57	53	53	67
Ireland	1999	72	73	78	80	76	79	83	85	86	87	85	87	88	87	87	87	86	86	84	80	78	78	79	67	69	70	75	76	79	76	80	85	83	84	84	84	90
Italy	1999	83	79	87	76	82	70	69	62	67	64	66	64	67	63	58	61	61	63	64	68	67	57	53	57	59	53	54	54	59	55	54	53	58	59	61	63	70
Latvia	2014							55	59	57	55	46	53	47	48	54	47	48	53	55	52	53	42	39	35	43	53	68	74	78	72	78	78	78	76	83	81	83
Lithuania	2015							63	69	60	54	46	55	54	48	57	48	52	52	50	51	48	46	42	43	40	40	50	63	73	67	65	67	65	68	65	67	83
Luxembourg	1999	81	84	91	89	88	83	88	85	87	89	81	84	81	85	82	83	86	80	79	86	80	80	78	72	77	79	78	80	80	80	82	87	85	77	81	85	83
Malta	2008							46	46	50	50	47	55	64	63	72	63	68	66	66	67	68	61	63	64	68	69	73	77	78	74	75	77	77	77	72	74	80
Netherlands	1999	66	71	75	67	67	62	58	72	71	71	70	73	77	81	80	83	81	81	71	76	74	71	73	75	68	71	76	76	75	75	77	77	79	78	80	80	84
Poland	—N/a							59	65	56	50	54	52	54	49	49	44	47	46	43	47	38	38	35	36	29	35	37	40	32	34	35	34	32	36	34	36	35
Portugal	1999	59	67	73	70	75	69	67	67	65	67	57	63	64	60	54	53	54	61	53	56	49	54	58	55	52	50	59	58	62	67	69	74	74	77	80	77	85
Romania	—N/a							74	71	74	66	65	70	73	71	72	71	72	71	64	64	65	61	60	56	56	58	63	65	64	63	57	55	60	57	61	55	83
Slovakia	2009							68	69	72	60	63	65	69	63	66	76	89	86	87	89	82	78	80	72	77	78	74	79	81	78	78	81	80	80	77	77	81
Slovenia	2007							85	87	83	77	82	83	91	86	90	90	86	88	82	83	81	81	80	83	77	78	79	75	78	77	80	85	83	85	84	86	91
Spain	1999	68	69	80	77	75	70	74	69	58	61	60	64	68	68	67	67	66	62	64	62	62	63	55	63	52	56	60	65	61	67	68	71	75	82	76	78	86
Sweden	—N/a	29	51	49	51	41	41	45	46	48	44	50	51	45	45	48	48	51	52	34	37	34	23	27	23	19	23	19	23	25	23	25	27	25	25	26	29	23
EU average	—N/a	59	61	67	63	66	59	60	63	59	60	59	60	63	61	60	61	61	60	56	58	56	53	52	53	51	52	55	56	57	56	55	58	60	61	61	62	70
Eurozone																																						79
United Kingdom	—N/a	25	27	31	28	24	23	26	31	28	28	28	29	29	24	26	28	27	28	19	17	21	15	15	14	15	19	16	20	20	20	17	24	23	30	27	28	

== See also ==
- History of the European Communities (1973–1993)
- History of the European Union (1993–2004)
- History of the European Union (2004–present)
- European Unit of Account
- Gold parity unit of account
