= Euro starter kits =

Packs of euro coins of all the eight denominations sealed in a plastic bag

Euro starter kits are packs of euro coins of all the eight denominations sealed in a plastic sachet. The kits' purpose was primarily to familiarise citizens of a nation joining the eurozone with their new currency. A further objective is to provide coins for retailers' cash registers well in advance of their respective €-Day. Usually, these kits are available from local banks some weeks before euro changeover.

Mainly there are two types of starter packs: business starter kits and those for the general public. The difference lies in the number of coins per pack. Business kits are intended for retailers. Therefore, they contain approximately 100 euro or more in coins, usually packed in rolls, whereas mini-starter kits are intended for the general public and usually have a small number of coins.

== Andorra ==
The Andorran government put in place a system of distribution of the starter kits so that the country's residents would gain priority over non-resident buyers.

== Austria ==
The Austrian euro starter kits were released on 15 December 2001. The general public kit was sold for €14.54 (200.07 ATS, however, rounded to 200 ATS), whereas the business starter kits were available much earlier, on 1 September 2001, and each kit contained €145.50 in Austrian euro coins. The quantity of the public and business starter kits produced was 6,000,000 and 750,000 kits, respectively.

Starter Kit	€2.00	€1.00	€0.50	€0.20	€0.10	€0.05	€0.02	€0.01	Face Value	Issue date	Quantity
Public Starter Kit	4 coins	4 coins	2 coins	3 coins	6 coins	4 coins	4 coins	6 coins	€14.54	15.12.2001	6,000,000
Business Starter Kit	1 roll (25 coins)	2 rolls (50 coins)	1 roll (40 coins)	1 roll (40 coins)	3 rolls (120 coins)	1 roll (50 coins)	2 rolls (100 coins)	2 rolls (100 coins)	€145.50	01.09.2001	750,000

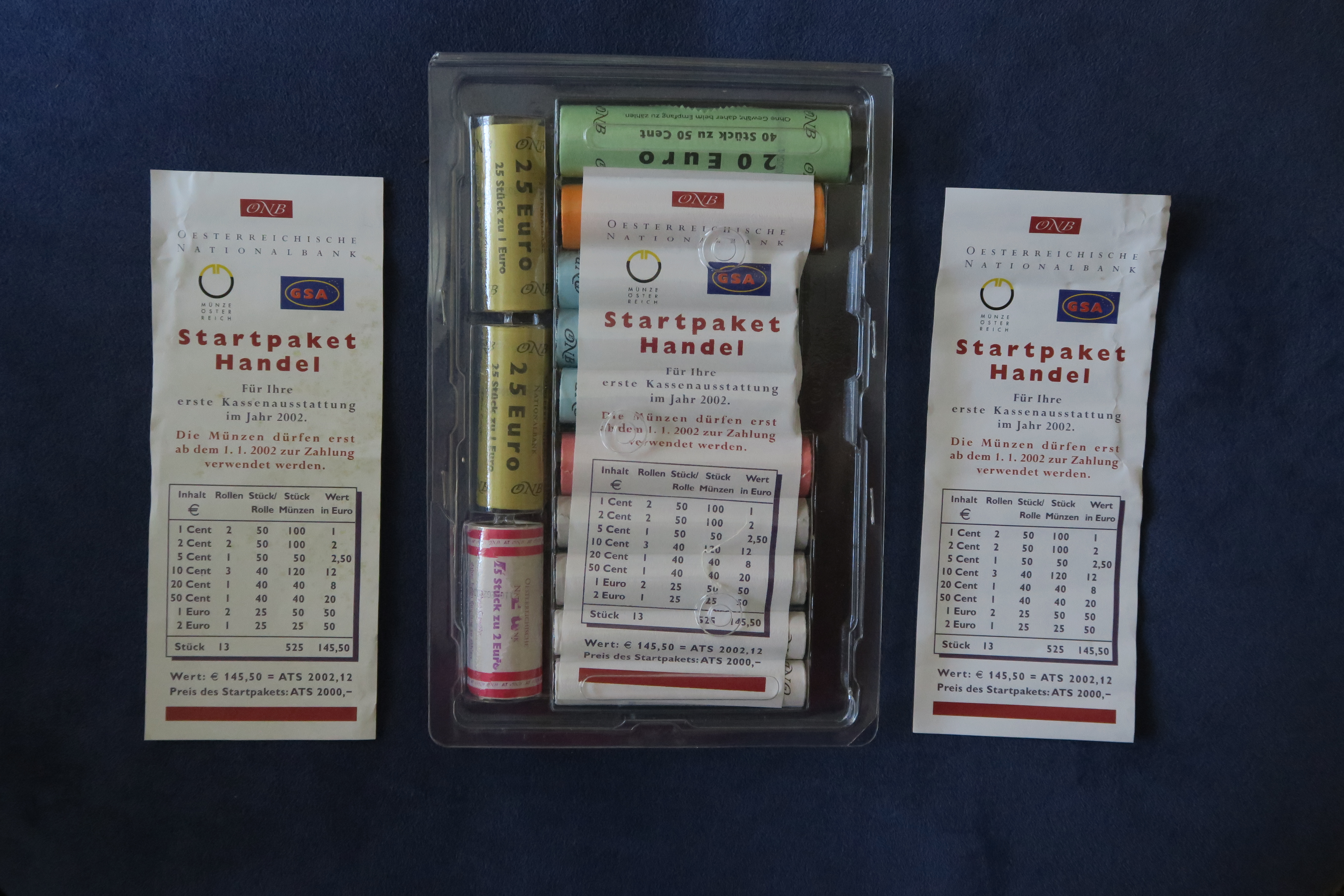
The Austrian Business Starter Kit

== Belgium ==
The Belgian mini starter kits were worth €12.40, equivalent to about 500.214 BEF, rounded to 500 BEF. The business starter kits were worth €240.

Belgian Starter Kit Content
Starter Kit	€2.00	€1.00	€0.50	€0.20	€0.10	€0.05	€0.02	€0.01	Face Value	Issue date	Quantity
Public Starter Kit	2 coins	5 coins	4 coins	3 coins	5 coins	4 coins	4 coins	2 coins	€12.40	15.12.2001	5,300,000

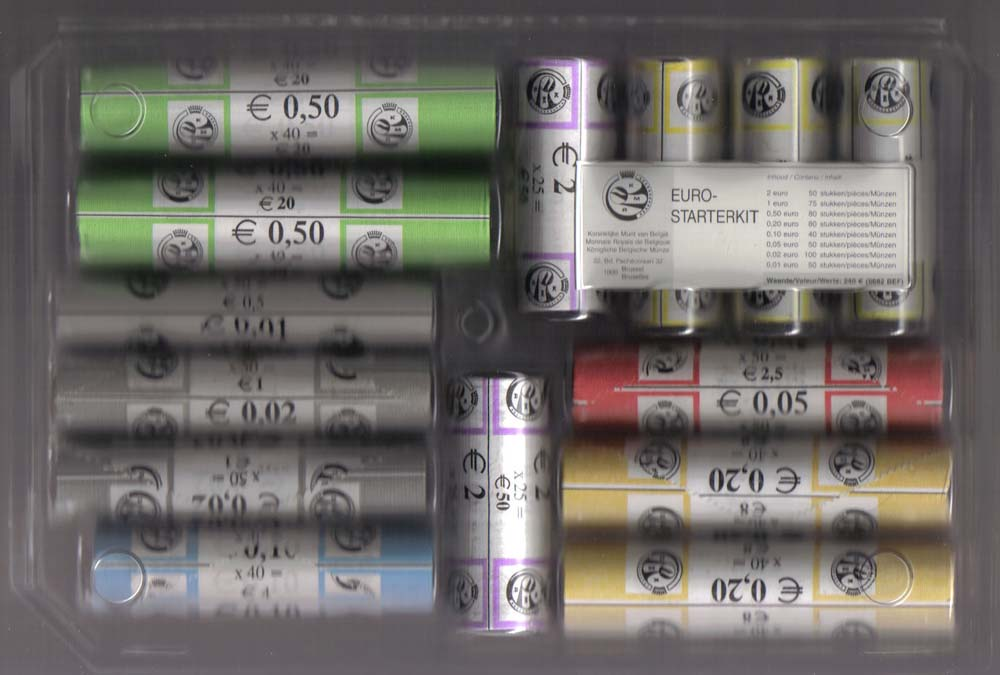
The Belgian Business Starter Kit

== Bulgaria ==
The Bulgarian euro starter kits were available to purchase from 1 to 31 December 2025. The kit for the general public contained 42 coins worth €10.23, equivalent to 20.01 BGN (due to the currency peg to the Deutsche Mark from 1997 on), but the purchase price was rounded down to 20 BGN. Meanwhile, the kit for businesses contained 420 coins worth €102.30, equivalent to 200.08 BGN, but sold for 200 BGN.

Bulgarian starter kit content
Starter kit	€2.00	€1.00	€0.50	€0.20	€0.10	€0.05	€0.02	€0.01	Face value	Issue date
Public Starter Kit	2 coins	2 coins	4 coins	5 coins	7 coins	6 coins	7 coins	9 coins	€10.23	01.12.2025
Business Starter Kit	20 coins	20 coins	40 coins	50 coins	70 coins	60 coins	70 coins	90 coins	€102.30	01.12.2025

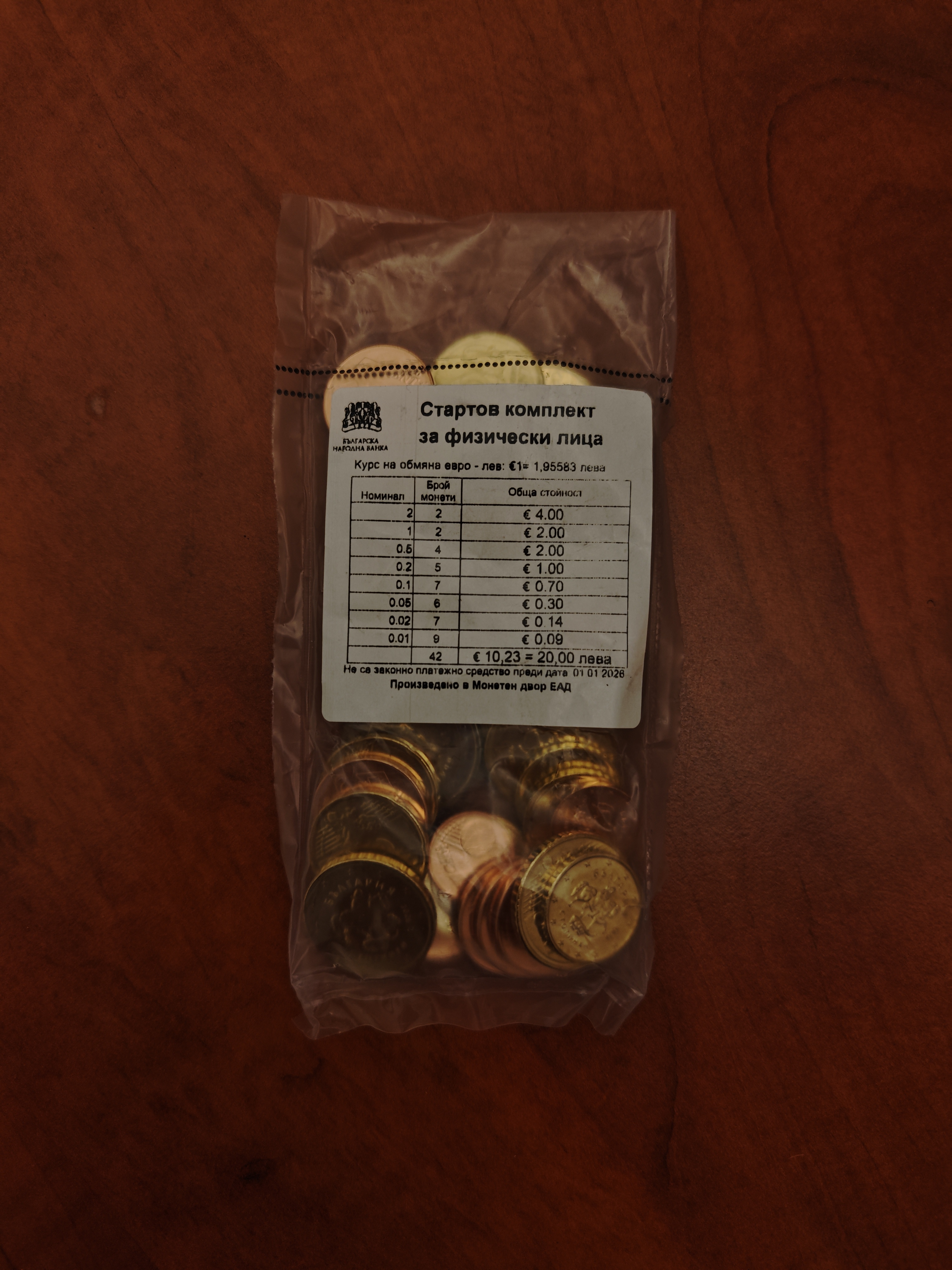
The Bulgarian Public Starter Kit

== Croatia ==
The Croatian euro starter kits were available for purchase from 1 to 31 December 2022. The general public kit contained 33 coins worth €13.28, equivalent to 100.06 HRK, but the purchase price was rounded down to 100 HRK (€13.27). The starter kits were sold in Croatian Post and FINA (Financial Agency) branches, as well as local commercial banks. Customers were allowed to buy a maximum of two kits in one transaction. The business starter kits contained 525 coins worth €145.50, and were available for purchase for 1,096.27 HRK. The quantity of public and business starter kits produced was 1,200,000 and 200,000, respectively.

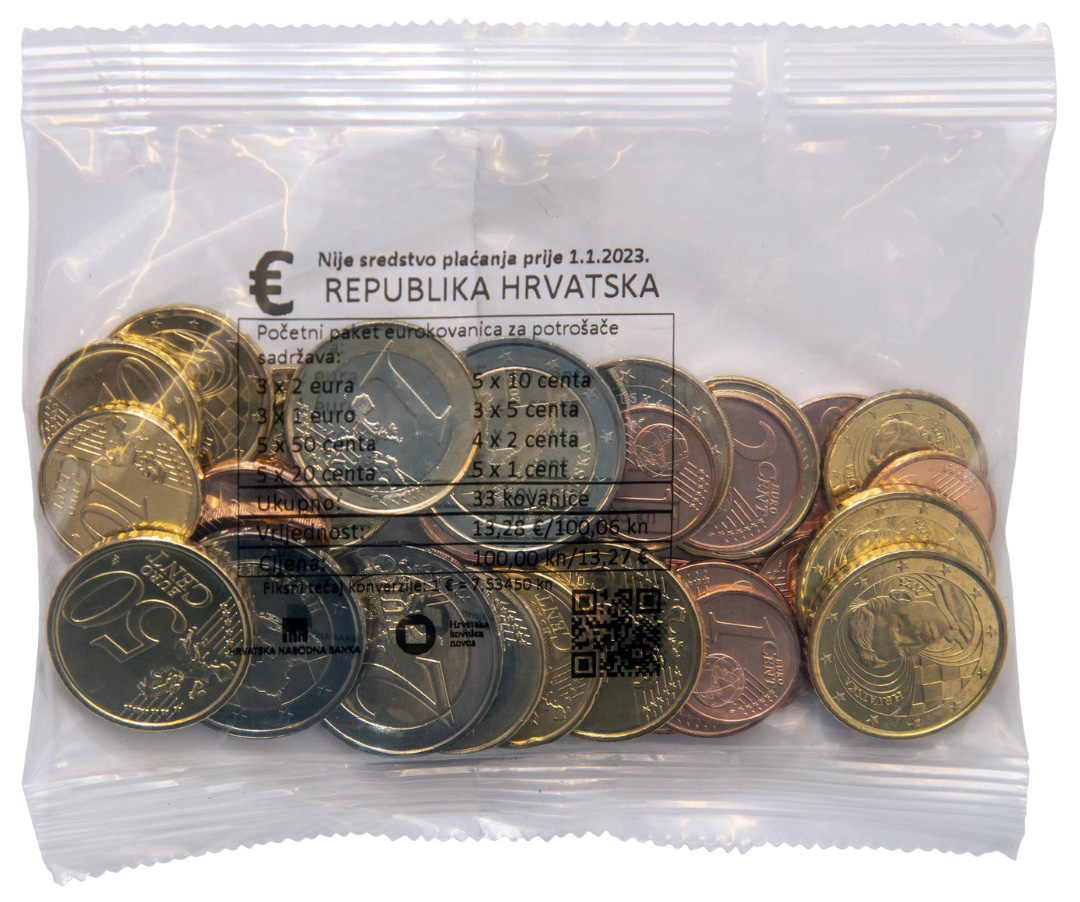
The Croatian Public Starter Kit

Croatian Starter Kits Content
Starter Kit	€2.00	€1.00	€0.50	€0.20	€0.10	€0.05	€0.02	€0.01	Face Value	Issue date	Quantity
Public Starter Kit	3 coins	3 coins	5 coins	5 coins	5 coins	3 coins	4 coins	5 coins	€13.28	01.12.2022	1,200,000
Business Starter Kit	25 coins	50 coins	40 coins	40 coins	120 coins	50 coins	100 coins	100 coins	€145.50	01.12.2022	200,000

== Cyprus ==
Cyprus, together with Malta, joined the eurozone on 1 January 2008. On 3 December 2007, the Central Bank of Cyprus issued mini-starter packs and business kits, so that Cypriots would have enough euro cash before €-Day.

Forty thousand starter kits, worth €172 each, were available for businesses, but only 22,000 were sold. Since these starter kits contained rolled coins, the remaining kits could easily be used by the banks after €-day. Another 250,000 mini-kits, worth €17.09 (10 CYP) each, were available for the general public. Some 189,000 mini-kits were sold. According to the Eurobarometer survey, more than 70% of those citizens who had bought a mini-kit opened it and used the coins after the changeover, while some 20% kept it untouched. After the changeover, the unsold mini-kits were exported to satisfy the demand of coin collectors abroad. Cypriot euro coins worth €3.5 million were exported in the first three weeks of January 2008.

Cypriot Starter Kits Content
Starter Kit	€2.00	€1.00	€0.50	€0.20	€0.10	€0.05	€0.02	€0.01	Face Value	Issue date	Quantity
Business Starter Kit	1 roll (25 coins)	2 rolls (50 coins)	2 rolls (80 coins)	2 rolls (80 coins)	2 rolls (80 coins)	2 rolls (100 coins)	2 rolls (100 coins)	2 rolls (100 coins)	€172.00	03.12.2007	40,000
Public mini-Starter Kit	3 coins	5 coins	7 coins	8 coins	5 coins	6 coins	6 coins	7 coins	€17.09	03.12.2007	250,000

== Estonia ==
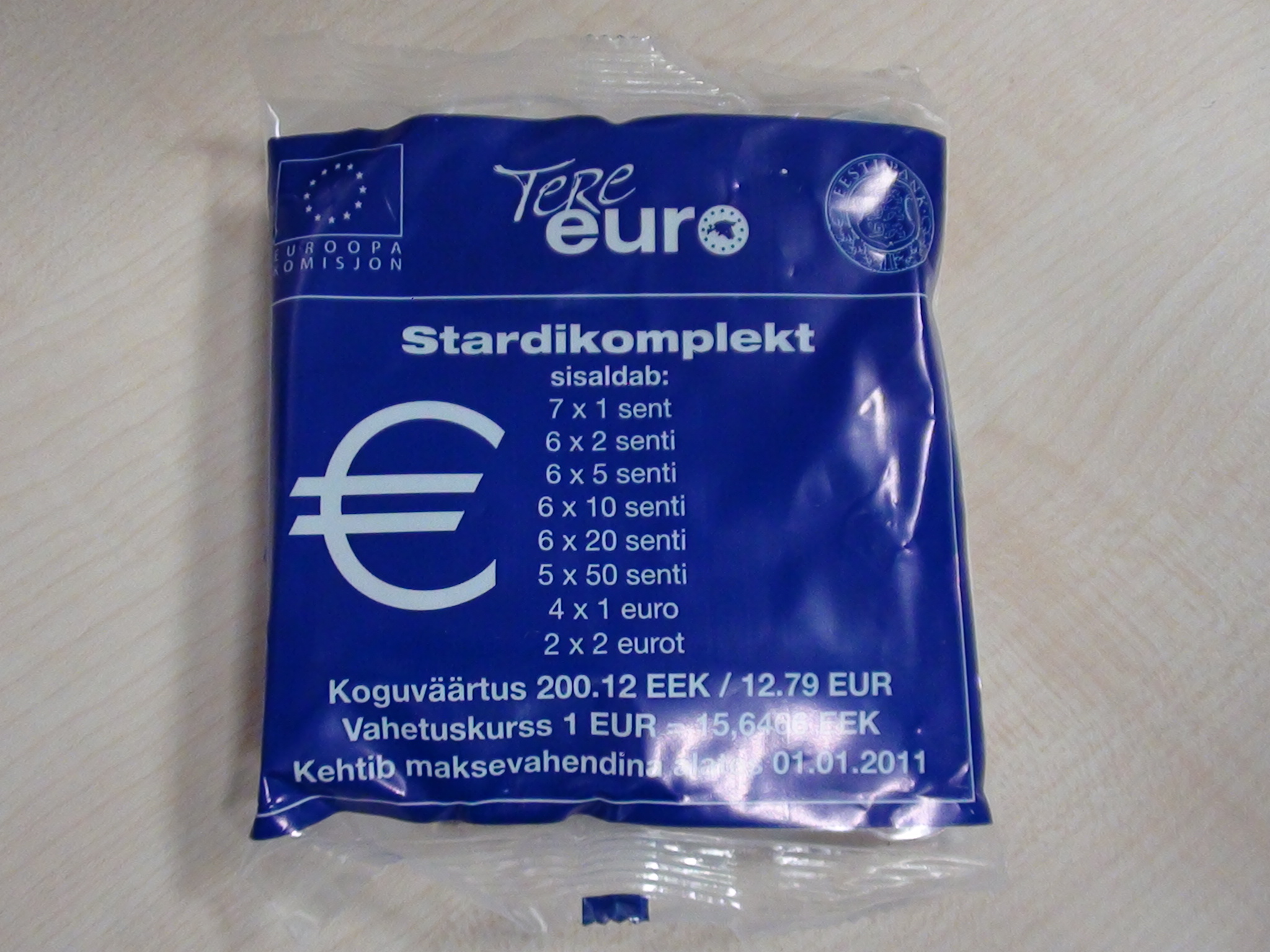
An Estonian euro starter kit

Estonia joined the eurozone on 1 January 2011. It was the 17th member state of the eurozone. Mini-euro starter kits were issued on 1 December 2010 and it has also issued 2 types of business kits. One business kit contains €111 worth of coins packed in rolls, whereas the other kit contains 15 rolls worth €198. The public starter kit contains €12.79 in coins, worth about 200.12 EEK, while the price was rounded down to 200 EEK.

Estonian Starter Kits Content
Starter Kit	€2.00	€1.00	€0.50	€0.20	€0.10	€0.05	€0.02	€0.01	Face Value	Issue date	Quantity
Public mini-Starter Kit	2 coins	4 coins	5 coins	6 coins	6 coins	6 coins	6 coins	7 coins	€12.79	01.12.2010	700,000
Business mini-Starter Kit	1 roll (25 coins)	1 roll (25 coins)	1 roll (40 coins)	1 roll (40 coins)	1 roll (40 coins)	1 roll (50 coins)	1 roll (50 coins)	1 roll (50 coins)	€111.00	01.12.2010	?

== Finland ==
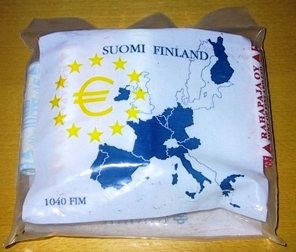
The Finnish Business Starter Kit

Finland issued public euro starter kit containing 1 coin of each denomination, which equates to €3.88, or about 23.07 FIM, priced at 23 FIM due to Swedish rounding.

Finnish Starter Kits Content
Starter Kit	€2.00	€1.00	€0.50	€0.20	€0.10	€0.05	€0.02	€0.01	Face Value	Issue date	Quantity
Business Starter Kit	1 roll (25 coins)	1 roll (25 coins)	3 rolls (120 coins)	2 rolls (80 coins)	3 rolls (120 coins)	2 rolls (100 coins)	–	–	€168.00	01.01.2002	?
Public mini-Starter Kit	1 coin	1 coin	1 coin	1 coin	1 coin	1 coin	1 coin	1 coin	€3.88	01.01.2002	500,000

== France ==
France was not just one of the founders of the European Union but also was one of the first countries to adopt the euro. The French euro starter packs were made available to the public on 14 December 2001. The kit contains €15.25, worth about 100.03 FRF (truncated to 100 FRF). The kits contained coins from 1999, 2000 and 2001.

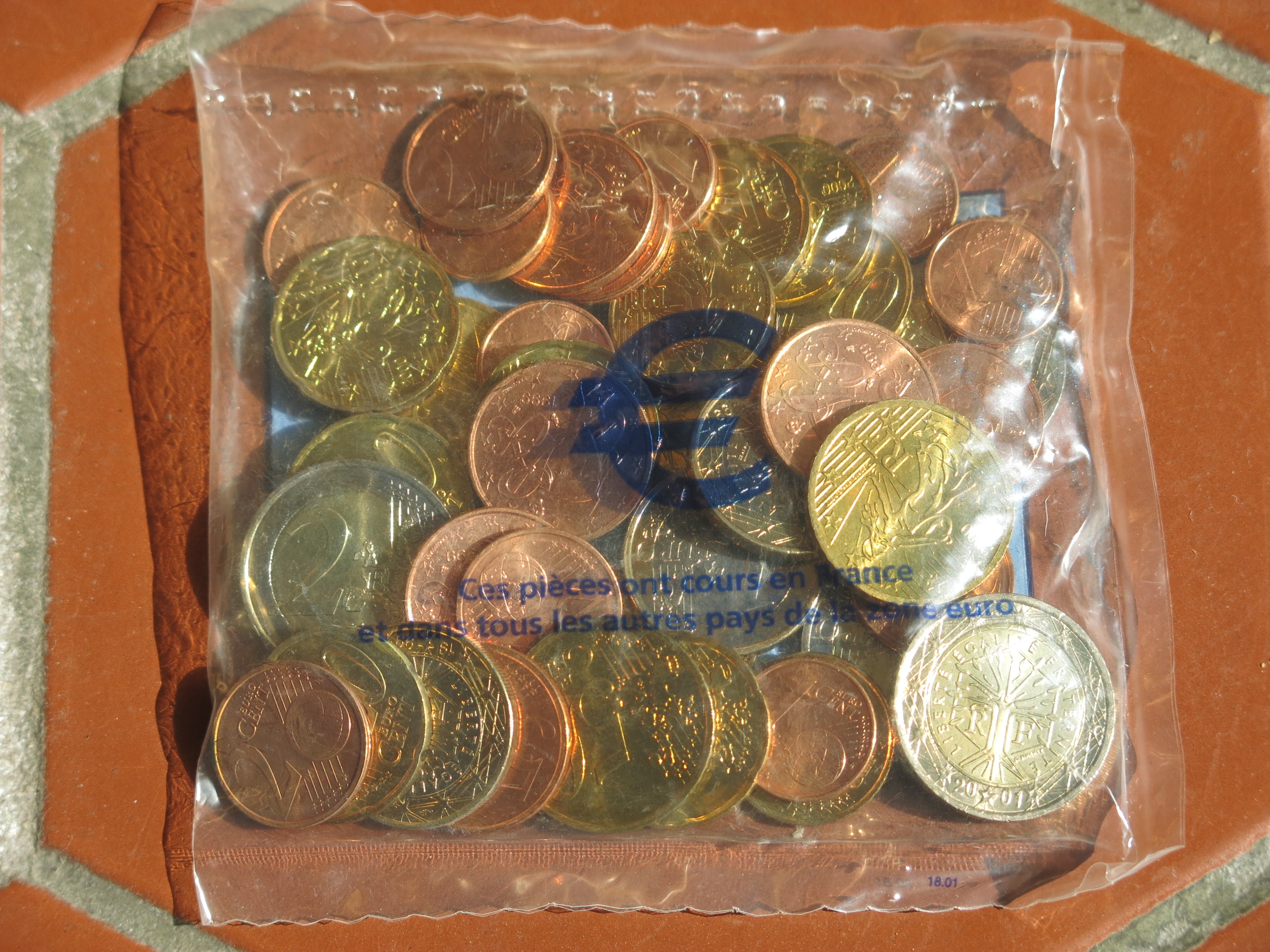
French euro starter kit

French Starter Kits Content
Starter Kit	€2.00	€1.00	€0.50	€0.20	€0.10	€0.05	€0.02	€0.01	Face Value	Issue date	Quantity
Public mini-Starter Kit	4 coins	3 coins	4 coins	7 coins	4 coins	5 coins	7 coins	6 coins	€15.25	14.12.2001	53,000,000

== Germany ==
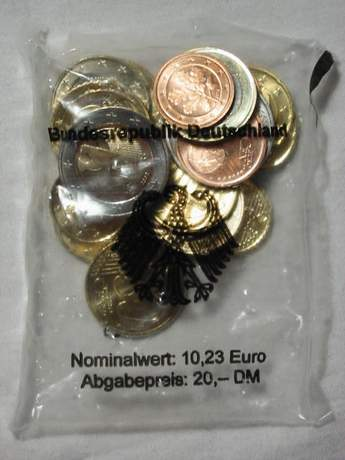
The German Starter Kit

In Germany, each starter kit contained 20 coins for a total of €10.23, equivalent to 20.01 DEM, rounded to 20 DEM. They were released to the public on 17 December 2001. There are five different kinds of kits, one for each mint (A, D, F, G and J). The following are the mintage quantities per mint:

- A : 12,100,000 Kits
- D : 11,600,000 Kits
- F : 12,100,000 Kits
- G : 8,100,000 Kits
- J : 9,600,000 Kits

Starter Kits	€2.00	€1.00	€0.50	€0.20	€0.10	€0.05	€0.02	€0.01	Face Value	Issue date	Quantity
Public mini-Starter Kit	2 coins	3 coins	4 coins	4 coins	3 coins	2 coins	1 coin	1 coin	€10.23	17.12.2001	53,542,150

== Greece ==
The Greek Starter Kit

The Greek kit contained coins with a total value of €14.67, or 4,998.8025 GRD, with the price rounded up to 5,000 GRD. More specifically, it contained:

- €2.00 * 2
- €1.00 * 5
- €0.50 * 6
- €0.20 * 7
- €0.10 * 8
- €0.05 * 6
- €0.02 * 6
- €0.01 * 5

== Ireland ==
Ireland issued 750,000 starter packs on 14 December 2001. Each starter pack contained 19 coins worth €6.35 in total, or a tiny bit over 5 IEP.

It contained:

- €2.00 * 1
- €1.00 * 2
- €0.50 * 2
- €0.20 * 4
- €0.10 * 4
- €0.05 * 2
- €0.02 * 1
- €0.01 * 3

== Italy ==
Italy issued 30,000,000 starter kits. Each starter kit had a face value of €12.91, equivalent to 24,997.2457 ITL, rounded to 25,000 ITL. There are two variations of these packs; one has text printed on the bag, whereas the other does not.

Italian Starter Kits Content
Starter Kit	€2.00	€1.00	€0.50	€0.20	€0.10	€0.05	€0.02	€0.01	Face Value	Issue date	Quantity
Public mini-Starter Kit	2 coins	4 coins	5 coins	5 coins	6 coins	10 coins	10 coins	11 coins	€12.91	15.12.2001	30,000,000

== Latvia ==
In December 2013 Latvia issued 800,000 starter kits. Each starter kit had a face value of €14.23, equivalent to 10.0009 LVL, with the price rounded to 10 LVL.

Latvian Starter Kits Content
Starter Kit	€2.00	€1.00	€0.50	€0.20	€0.10	€0.05	€0.02	€0.01	Face Value	Issue date	Quantity
Public mini-Starter Kit	2 coins	4 coins	7 coins	8 coins	7 coins	5 coins	6 coins	6 coins	€14.23	10.12.2013	800,000

== Lithuania ==
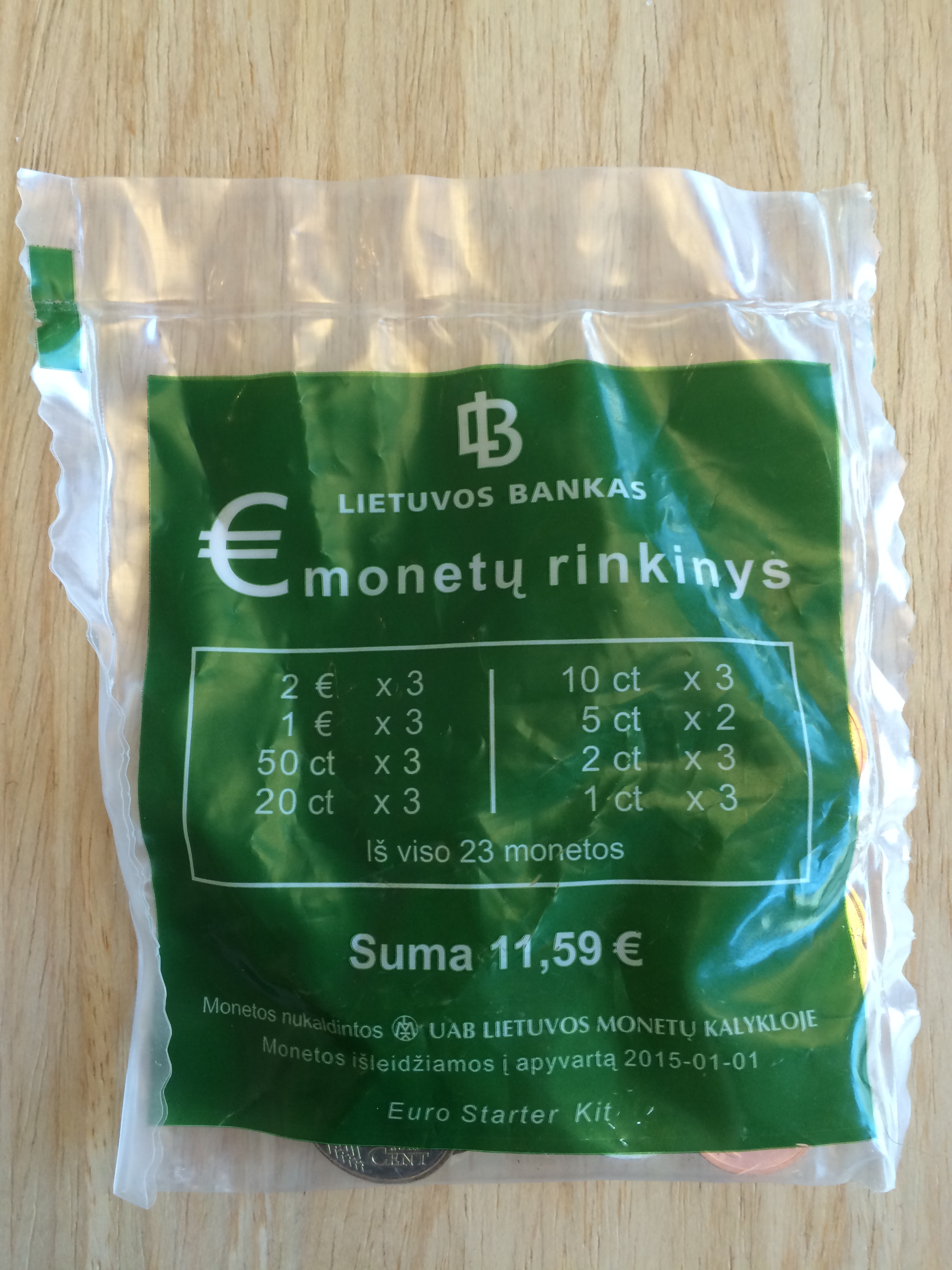
The Lithuanian Starter Kit

In Lithuania, each starter kit contained 23 coins for a total of €11.59, equivalent to 40.02 LTL (rounded to 40 LTL). They were released to the public on 1 December 2014. Lithuania issued 900,000 public mini-starter kits.

Lithuanian Starter Kits Content
Starter Kit	€2.00	€1.00	€0.50	€0.20	€0.10	€0.05	€0.02	€0.01	Face Value	Issue date	Quantity
Public mini-Starter Kit	3 coins	3 coins	3 coins	3 coins	3 coins	2 coins	3 coins	3 coins	€11.59	01.12.2014	900,000
Business Starter Kit (First variant)	1 roll (25 coins)	1 roll (25 coins)	1 roll (40 coins)	1 roll (40 coins)	1 roll (40 coins)	1 roll (50 coins)	1 roll (50 coins)	1 roll (50 coins)	€111.00	01.12.2014	60,000
Business Starter Kit (Second variant)	2 rolls (50 coins)	2 rolls (50 coins)	1 roll (40 coins)	2 rolls (80 coins)	2 rolls (80 coins)	1 roll (50 coins)	2 rolls (100 coins)	3 rolls (150 coins)	€200.00	01.12.2014	50,000

== Luxembourg ==
Except for different text on the bag and different national sides, Luxembourg's starter sets were the same as the Belgian sets, as Belgium and Luxembourg were already in a pre-existing currency union. Each set also had the equivalent of 500.214 LUF in euro coins, in the same quantities as the Belgian set. (refer to the Belgian set table for info)

== Malta ==
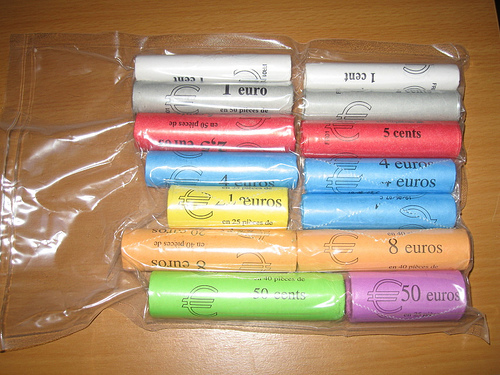
Maltese Business Starter Kit

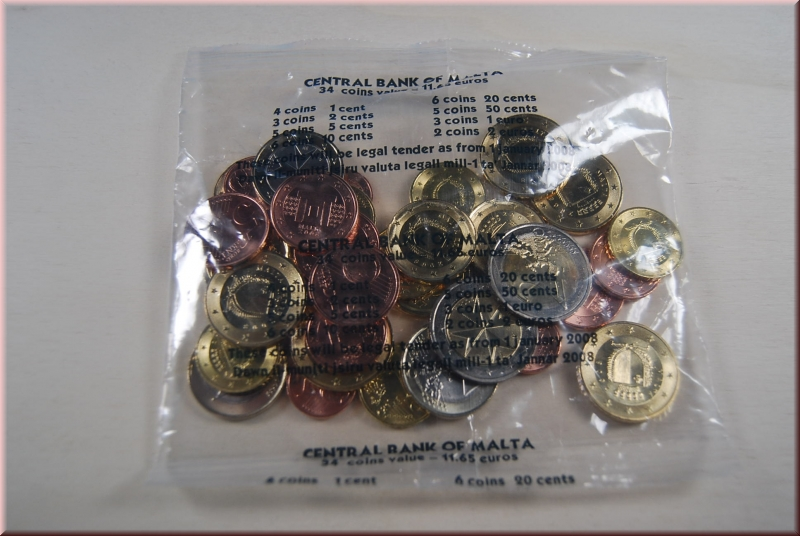
Maltese General Public Starter Kit

The first Maltese euro coins were made available to the public on 1 December 2007, as business starter packs worth €131 each were introduced for small businesses to fill up their cash registers with a sufficient amount of euro coins before €-day. Mini-kits each worth €11.65 (5.001 MTL, rounded down to 5 MTL) were made available to the general public on 10 December 2007. Malta issued 33,000 business starter kits and 330,000 starter kits for the general public. All the 33,000 starter kits for businesses were sold.

Maltese Starter Kits Content
Starter Kit	€2.00	€1.00	€0.50	€0.20	€0.10	€0.05	€0.02	€0.01	Face Value	Issue date	Quantity
Business Starter Kit	1 roll (25 coins)	1 roll (25 coins)	1 roll (40 coins)	2 rolls (80 coins)	3 rolls (120 coins)	2 rolls (100 coins)	2 rolls (100 coins)	2 rolls (100 coins)	€131.00	01.12.2007	33,000
Public mini-Starter Kit	2 coins	3 coins	5 coins	6 coins	6 coins	5 coins	3 coins	4 coins	€11.65	10.12.2007	330,000

== Monaco ==
Despite not being a member of the European Union, in 1999 Monaco also adopted the euro. This is mainly because Monaco never had its own currency and was using the French franc. The European Union has a special agreement with Monaco that normates the minting of a limited number of euro coins. Late in 2001, Monaco issued 51,200 starter kits for the nominal price of €15.25 (100 francs) each; however, today their price on commercial websites is more than €600.

Starter Kit	€2.00	€1.00	€0.50	€0.20	€0.10	€0.05	€0.02	€0.01	Face Value	Issue date	Quantity
Public mini-Starter Kit	4 coins	3 coins	4 coins	7 coins	4 coins	5 coins	7 coins	6 coins	€15.25	Late 2001	51,200

== Netherlands ==
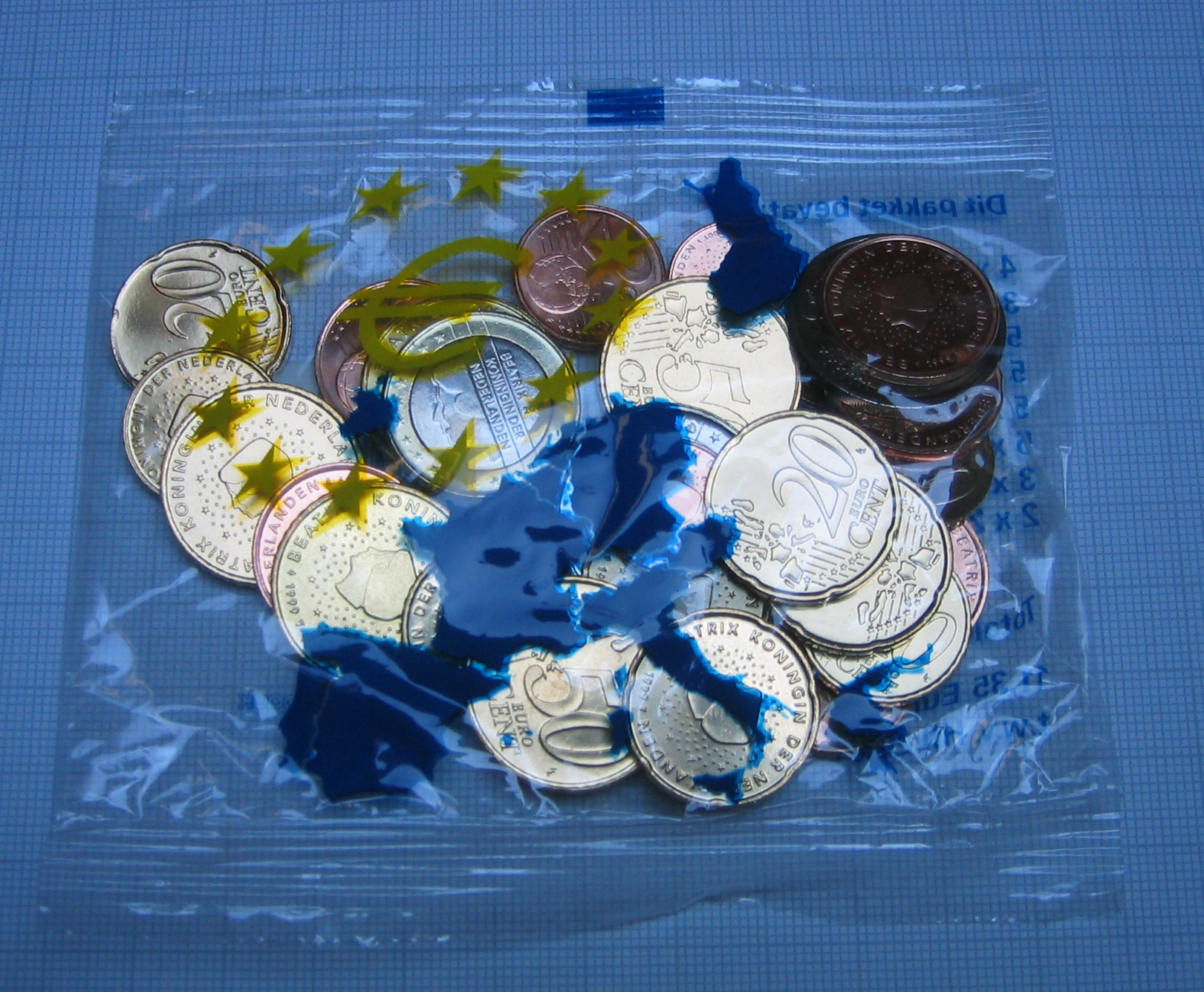
The Dutch Starter Kit

The Netherlands issued two different starter kits, intended to educate its citizens about the euro. One contained one of each coin and was distributed in a card, for free to the citizens of the Netherlands. Packaged, mint condition cards have since become collector items. Additional bags of assorted euro coins could be purchased to familiarise oneself with them. These bags contained €11.35 worth of coins and sold for 25 NLG (in fact worth 25.01 gulden), which was nearly the same as the value of the coins.

Starter Kits	€2.00	€1.00	€0.50	€0.20	€0.10	€0.05	€0.02	€0.01	Face Value	Issue date	Quantity
Public Starter Kit	2 coins	3 coins	5 coins	5 coins	5 coins	5 coins	3 coins	4 coins	€11.35	?	8,800,000
Public Starter Kit	1 coin	1 coin	1 coin	1 coin	1 coin	1 coin	1 coin	1 coin	€3.88	?	16,000,000

== Portugal ==
One million starter kits containing the Portuguese euro coins were made available on 17 December 2001. Each kit was sold for 2,005 PTE (equivalent to about €10). On 1 September 2001 business kits with €250 of euro coins were made available. The business kit included: - 50 coins of €2.00 - 50 coins of €1.00 - 120 coins of €0.50 - 120 coins of €0.20 - 80 coins of €0.10 - 100 coins of €0.05 - 100 coins of €0.02 - 100 coins of €0.01

Starter Kits	€2.00	€1.00	€0.50	€0.20	€0.10	€0.05	€0.02	€0.01	Face Value	Issue date	Quantity
Public Mini-Starter Kit	2 coins	2 coins	4 coins	5 coins	6 coins	5 coins	5 coins	5 coins	€10.00	17.12.2001	1,000,000
Business Starter Kit	2 rolls (50 coins)	2 rolls (50 coins)	3 rolls (120 coins)	3 rolls (120 coins)	2 rolls (80 coins)	2 rolls (100 coins)	2 rolls (100 coins)	2 rolls (100 coins)	€250.00	01.09.2001	?

== San Marino ==
San Marino in 2002 was among those non-EU nations that joined the euro. Out of all the countries that switched to the euro, San Marino was the only country not to issue a euro starter kit.

== Slovakia ==
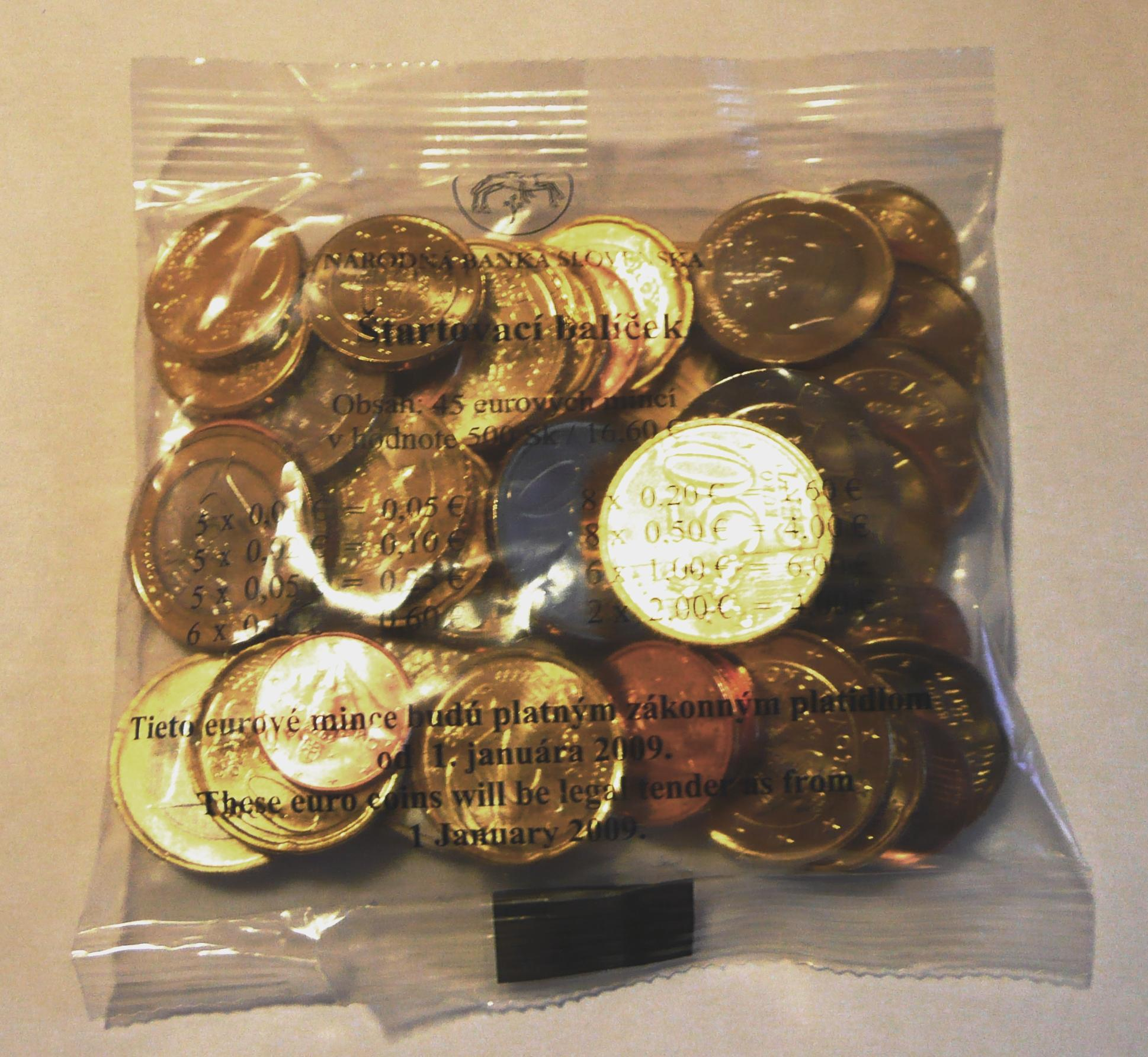
The Slovak Starter Kit

Slovakia joined the eurozone on 1 January 2009. As part of the euro changeover preparation, Slovakia issued 1,200,000 starter packs for the general public on 1 December 2008. Each starter kit contains €16.60 in coins; this is equivalent to 500.09 SKK, but the price was rounded-down to 500 SKK. The starter kits were available for purchase in the Slovak Post branches, local commercial banks and National Bank of Slovakia. Almost 90% of the Slovak starter kits were sold in the first five days.

Slovak Starter Kit Content
Starter Kit	€2.00	€1.00	€0.50	€0.20	€0.10	€0.05	€0.02	€0.01	Face Value	Issue date	Quantity
Slovakia mini-Starter Kit	2 coins	6 coins	8 coins	8 coins	6 coins	5 coins	5 coins	5 coins	€16.60	01.12.2008	1,200,000

== Slovenia ==
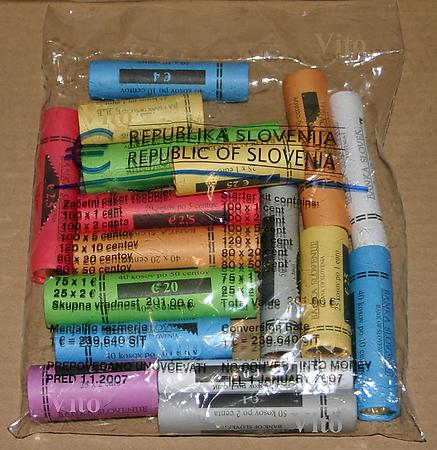
Slovenia – Professional Cash Handlers Starter Kit

Slovenia was the first country to join the eurozone out of the 10 new member states that joined the European Union in 2004. On 1 December 2006, special starter packs of Slovenian euro coins were made available to professional cash handlers. On 15 December 2006 the general public could buy euro starter kits; 450,000 of these kits were produced. Each kit contained 44 coins, amounting to €12.52 (3,000.2928 SIT, rounded to 3,000 SIT).

Slovenian Starter Kits Content
Starter Kit	€2.00	€1.00	€0.50	€0.20	€0.10	€0.05	€0.02	€0.01	Face Value	Issue date	Quantity
Professional Cash Handlers Starter Kit	1 roll (25 coins)	3 rolls (75 coins)	2 rolls (80 coins)	2 rolls (80 coins)	3 rolls (120 coins)	2 rolls (100 coins)	2 rolls (100 coins)	2 rolls (100 coins)	€201.00	01.12.2006	45,000
Public mini-Starter Kit	2 coins	4 coins	4 coins	7 coins	6 coins	6 coins	7 coins	8 coins	€12.52	15.12.2006	450,000

== Spain ==
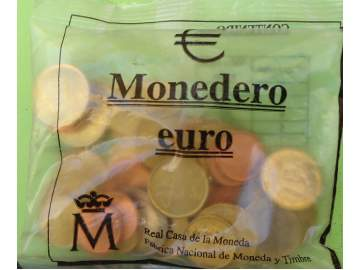
Spain – "Monedero Euro"

Spain was one of the first countries to join the eurozone. The Spanish starter kits or "Monedero Euro" had a face value of €12.02, equivalent to 1,999.959 ESP; however, they were sold for 2,000 ESP. These kits were released on 15 December 2001. On 1 September 2001, special starter kits for merchants were issued. The latter had a face value of €30.41 (5060 pesetas).

Spanish Starter Kits Content
Starter Kit	€2.00	€1.00	€0.50	€0.20	€0.10	€0.05	€0.02	€0.01	Face Value	Issue date	Quantity
Business Starter Kit	15 coins			2 coins				1 coin	€30.41	01.09.2001	3,500,000
Public mini-Starter Kit	2 coins	2 coins	7 coins	7 coins	6 coins	6 coins	9 coins	4 coins	€12.02	15.12.2001	23,000,000

== Vatican ==
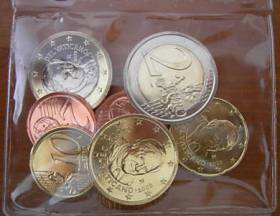
Vatican 2008, 2nd Starter Kit

The Vatican City issued 1,000 starter kits on 1 March 2002. It was the only nation to issue starter kits well after the eurochangeover, thus, these starter kits became collectible items. Each kit consisted of eight coins, one coin of each denomination (€0.01 – €2.00), thereby having a face value of €3.88. Each coin has a depiction of the now late pope, John Paul II. Although these packs were available for free, nowadays, their price on commercial websites is significant. With only 1,000 issues, this is the rarest starter kit.

In 2008 the Vatican City released 6,400 'starter kits'; however, this time the coins featured the now late Benedict XVI. Each kit contains eight coins, again a coin of each denomination, and was given to the inhabitants and employees of the Vatican for free.

Vatican Starter Kit Content
Starter Kit	€2.00	€1.00	€0.50	€0.20	€0.10	€0.05	€0.02	€0.01	Face Value	Issue date	Quantity
Vatican Starter Kit 2002	1 coin	1 coin	1 coin	1 coin	1 coin	1 coin	1 coin	1 coin	€3.88	01.03.2002	1,000
Vatican Starter Kit 2008	1 coin	1 coin	1 coin	1 coin	1 coin	1 coin	1 coin	1 coin	€3,88	unknown.2008	6,400

== Summary ==
=== General Public Mini-Starter Kits ===
Country	Coins	€2	€1	50	20	10	5	2	1	Face Value		Quantity
Andorra	8	1	1	1	1	1	1	1	1	€3.88	-	-
Austria	33	4	4	2	3	6	4	4	6	€14.54	200.074 ATS	6,000,000
Belgium	29	2	5	4	3	5	4	4	2	€12.40	500.214 BEF	5,300,000
Bulgaria	42	2	2	4	5	7	6	7	9	€10.23	20.01 BGN	1,000,000
Croatia	33	3	3	5	5	5	3	4	5	€13.28	100.058 HRK	1,200,000
Cyprus	47	3	5	7	8	5	6	6	7	€17.09	10.002 CYP	250,000
Estonia	42	2	4	5	6	6	6	6	7	€12.79	200.120 EEK	700,000
Finland	8	1	1	1	1	1	1	1	1	€3.88	23.069 FIM	500,000
France	40	4	3	4	7	4	5	7	6	€15.25	100.033 FRF	53,000,000
Germany	20	2	3	4	4	3	2	1	1	€10.23	20.008 DEM	53,542,150
Greece	45	2	5	6	7	8	6	6	5	€14.67	4,998.802 GRD	3,000,000
Ireland	19	1	2	2	4	4	2	1	3	€6.35	5.001 IEP	750,000
Italy	53	2	4	5	5	6	10	10	11	€12.91	24,997.245 ITL	30,000,000
Latvia	45	2	4	7	8	7	5	6	6	€14.23	10.001 LVL	800,000
Lithuania	23	3	3	3	3	3	2	3	3	€11.59	40.017 LTL	900,000
Luxembourg	29	2	5	4	3	5	4	4	2	€12.40	500.214 LUF	700,000
Malta	34	2	3	5	6	6	5	3	4	€11.65	5.001 MTL	330,000
Monaco	40	4	3	4	7	4	5	7	6	€15.25	100.033 FRF	51,200
Netherlands	8	1	1	1	1	1	1	1	1	€3.88	8.550 NLG	16,000,000
Netherlands	32	2	3	5	5	5	5	3	4	€11.35	25.012 NLG	8,800,000
Portugal	34	2	2	4	5	6	5	5	5	€10.00	2,004.820 PTE	1,000,000
Slovakia	45	2	6	8	8	6	5	5	5	€16.60	500.092 SKK	1,200,000
Slovenia	44	2	4	4	7	6	6	7	8	€12.52	3,000.293 SIT	450,000
Spain	43	2	2	7	7	6	6	9	4	€12.02	1,999.959 ESP	23,000,000
Vatican 2002	8	1	1	1	1	1	1	1	1	€3.88	7,512.727 VAL	1,000
Vatican 2008	8	1	1	1	1	1	1	1	1	€3.88	7,512.727 VAL	6,400

=== Business Starter Kits ===
Country	Rolls	€2	€1	50	20	10	5	2	1	Face Value		Quantity
Croatia	-	-	-	-	-	-	-	-	-	€145.50	1,096.269 HRK	200,000
Cyprus	15	1	2	2	2	2	2	2	2	€172	100.667 CYP	40,000
Finland	12	1	1	3	2	3	2	-	-	€168	998.883 FIM	?
Malta	14	1	1	1	2	3	2	2	2	€131	56.238 MTL	33,000
Portugal	18	2	2	3	3	2	2	2	2	€250	50,120.5 PTE	?
Slovenia	17	1	3	2	2	3	2	2	2	€201	48,167.64 SIT	45,000
Spain	18	15	-	-	2	-	-	-	1	€30.41	5,059.798 ESP	3,500,000
Lithuania	8	1	1	1	1	1	1	1	1	€111.00	383.261 LTL	60,000
Lithuania	15	2	2	1	2	2	1	2	3	€200.00	690.56 LTL	50,000
