= European Currency Unit =

Obsolete unit of account of the European Community

ISO 4217
- Code: XEU

Units of account
- Symbol: ₠
- Nickname: ECU

Demographics
- Date of introduction: 13 April 1979
- Replaced: European Unit of Account
- Date of withdrawal: 31 December 1998
- Replaced by: Euro
- User(s): European Economic Community (1979–1998); European Union (1993–1998)

Valuation
- Pegged with: 8 currencies (1979–1989); 12 currencies (1989–1998)
- This infobox shows the latest status before this currency was rendered obsolete.

The European Currency Unit (French: Unité de compte européenne, Spanish: Unidad Monetaria Europea, German: Europäische Währungseinheit ; ⟨₠⟩, ECU, or XEU) was a unit of account used by the European Economic Community and composed of a basket of member country currencies. The ECU came in to operation on 13 March 1979 and was assigned the ISO 4217 code. The ECU replaced the European Unit of Account (EUA) at parity in 1979, and it was later replaced by the euro (EUR) at parity on 1 January 1999.

As a unit of account, the ECU was not a circulating currency and did not replace or override the value of the currency of EEC member countries. However, it was used to price some international financial transactions and capital transfers.

== Exchange rate ==
Using a mechanism known as the "snake in the tunnel", the European Exchange Rate Mechanism was an attempt to minimize fluctuations between member state currencies—initially by managing the variance of each against its respective ECU reference rate—with the aim to achieve fixed ratios over time, and so enable the European Single Currency (which became known as the euro) to replace national currencies.

== Hard ECU proposal ==
In 1990 the British Chancellor of the Exchequer John Major proposed the creation of a 'hard' ECU, which different national currencies could compete against and, if the ECU was successful, could lead to a single currency. The move was seen by France and Germany as a wrecking tactic, especially when Margaret Thatcher, the increasingly Eurosceptic British Prime Minister, announced her outright opposition to the European Economic and Monetary Union (EMU), and the idea was abandoned.

== Euro replaces the ECU ==
On 1 January 1999, the euro (with the code EUR and symbol ⟨€⟩) replaced the ECU at par (one-to-one). Unlike the ECU, the euro is a real currency, although not all member states participate (for details on euro membership see Eurozone). Two of the countries in the ECU basket of currencies, the UK and Denmark, did not join the eurozone, and a third, Greece, joined late. On the other hand, Finland and Austria joined the eurozone from the beginning, even though their currencies were not part of the ECU basket, since they had joined the EU in 1995, two years after the ECU composition was "frozen".

=== Legal implications ===
Due to the ECU being used in some international financial transactions, there was a concern that foreign courts might not recognize the euro as the legal successor to the ECU. This was unlikely to be a problem, since it is a generally accepted principle of private international law that states determine their currencies, and that therefore states would accept the European Union legislation to that effect. However, for abundant caution, several foreign jurisdictions adopted legislation to ensure a smooth transition. Of particular importance, the U.S. states of Illinois and New York adopted legislation to ensure a large proportion of international financial contracts recognized the euro as the successor of the ECU.

== Symbol and name ==
The ECU's symbol, ₠, consists of an interlaced C and E —the initials of "European Community" in many languages of Europe. However, the symbol was not widely adopted. Few computer systems utilized by financial institutions and governments could render it, and commercial payment systems were obliged to use the ISO code, XEU, as with other currencies without widely recognised currency symbols. The Unicode designation for the ECU symbol (U+20A0 ₠ EURO-CURRENCY SIGN) was not implemented on many personal computer operating systems until the release of Unicode v2.1 in May 1998, which also introduced the euro sign (U+20AC € EURO SIGN). Microsoft did include the ECU symbol in many of its European versions of Windows beginning in the early 1990s; however, accessing it required the use of an Alt code, and not all typefaces provided a glyph. By 2009, Microsoft referred to the ECU symbol as "historical". Support among other operating systems, including Macintosh operating systems, was inconsistent.

Although the acronym for ECU is formed from the English name of the unit, the écu was a family of gold coins minted during the reign of Louis IX of France. The name of the ECU's successor, the euro, was chosen because the name did not favor any single language, nation, or historical period.

== Coins and notes ==
As the ECU was only an electronic unit of account and not a full currency, it did not have any official coins or notes that could be used for everyday transactions. However, various European countries and organizations like the European Parliament made commemorative and mock-up coins and notes. A common theme on the coins was usually celebrating European unity, such as celebrating membership of the European Union.

Gibraltar issued commemorative coins from 1993 through 1996, though these were (nominally) legal tender only in Gibraltar, which uses the pound sterling.

== Currency basket ==
Composition of 1 ECU
Period	No. of national currency units (weight, i.e. % contribution to total value)											
1979–1984 (Note: Period from 13 March 1979 – 16 September 1984.)	(Belgium) BEF	(Germany) DEM	(Denmark) DKK	(France) FRF	(United Kingdom) GBP	(Republic of Ireland) IEP	(Italy) ITL	(Netherlands) NLG	(Luxembourg) LUF (Note: The Luxembourg franc was in a currency union with the Belgian franc, thus represented in the BEF's weight and percentage of the ECU.)			
1979–1984	3.80 (9.64%)	0.828 (32.98%)	0.217 (3.06%)	1.15 (19.83%)	0.0885 (13.34%)	0.00759 (1.15%)	109 (9.49%)	0.286 (10.51%)	—			
1984–1989 (Note: Period from 17 September 1984 – 21 September 1989.)	(Belgium) BEF	(Germany) DEM	(Denmark) DKK	(France) FRF	(United Kingdom) GBP	(Republic of Ireland) IEP	(Italy) ITL	(Netherlands) NLG	(Luxembourg) LUF			
1984–1989	3.85 (8.57%)	0.719 (32.08%)	0.219 (2.69%)	1.31 (19.06%)	0.0878 (14.98%)	0.00871 (1.20%)	140 (9.98%)	0.256 (10.13%)	—			
1989–1998 (Note: Period from 21 September 1989 – 31 December 1998.)	(Belgium) BEF	(Germany) DEM	(Denmark) DKK	(France) FRF	(United Kingdom) GBP	(Republic of Ireland) IEP	(Italy) ITL	(Netherlands) NLG	(Luxembourg) LUF	(Spain) ESP	(Greece) GRD	(Portugal) PTE
1989–1998	3.301 (8.183%)	0.6242 (31.915%)	0.1976 (2.653%)	1.332 (20.306%)	0.08784 (12.452%)	0.008552 (1.086%)	151.8 (7.84%)	0.2198 (9.87%)	0.13 (0.322%)	6.885 (4.138%)	1.44 (0.437%)	1.393 (0.695%)
1999	(European Union) EUR											
1999	1.0 (100%)											

== See also ==
- Asian Monetary Unit – Proposed basket of currencies
- Eco (currency) – Proposed currency of ECOWAS
- European Unit of Account – Monetary unit used from 1975 to 1979
- Franc Poincaré – Historic unit of account for international settlements
- Gold parity unit of account – European unit of account, 1958 – early 1970s
- Green pound – Nominal exchange rate for agricultural subsidies
- World currency unit – Two proposals for an international unit of account
