= Franc Poincaré =

Historic unit of account for international settlements

The Franc Poincaré is a unit of account that was used in the international regulation of liability. It was introduced on June 25, 1928, as a replacement for the Germinal franc, which had been established by Napoleon Bonaparte in 1803. It was defined as 65.5 milligrams of gold of millesimal fineness .900. Formerly it was identical to the French franc, although it has not been so since the 1920s.

Practice on its conversion to national currencies varies from state to state; in most states the conversion factor is based not on the market price of gold, but on an official price (a remnant of the gold standard, frequently far below its market price today). The Franc Poincaré has been replaced for most purposes by special drawing rights.

Conventions which used the Franc Poincaré included the Convention for the Unification of Certain Rules Relating to International Carriage by Air, the International Convention on Civil Liability for Oil Pollution Damage and the International Convention on the Establishment of an International Fund for Compensation for Oil Pollution Damage.

== See also ==
- European Currency Unit – Obsolete unit of account of the European Community, used between members of the EC/EU before the euro.
