= Green pound =

Nominal exchange rate for agricultural subsidies

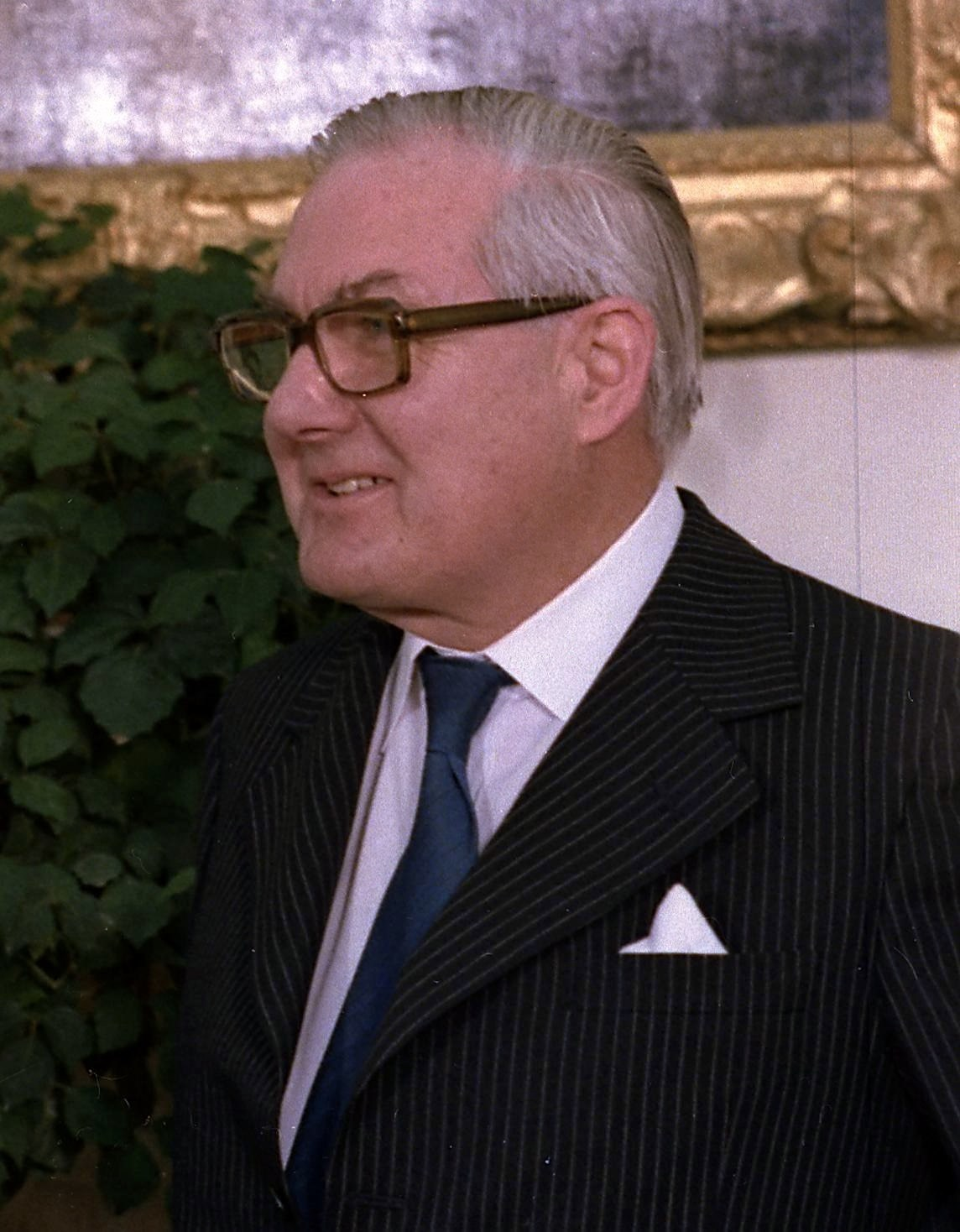
James Callaghan's government were defeated over their plans to devalue the green pound by 5% in January 1978

In the United Kingdom, the green pound was the common name for an exchange rate that was used to calculate the value of financial support within the European Union's Common Agricultural Policy until 1999.

== Background ==
Prior to the institution of a common currency, the then European Economic Community decided in 1962 to denominate its transactions in its own internal unit of account – initially the gold parity unit of account, fixed to the value of gold, and equivalent to the US dollar.

Following the devaluation of the French franc and the revaluation of the Deutsche Mark in 1969, the governments involved considered that agricultural support should not be subject to the fluctuations of floating exchange rates, arguing that lower prices would be unacceptable for farmers, while higher prices would be inflationary. Instead, they continued to use a form of fixed exchange rates for agricultural support, resulting in the so-called 'agricultural conversion rates' or 'green exchange rates', including the green pound after the United Kingdom's accession to the EEC on 1 January 1973.

== Revaluations, devaluations and politics ==
Although the value of the green pound was changed from time to time, initially such changes could only take place by agreement between the governments, making the value of the green pound a significant political issue. At certain points during the 1970s the green pound was overvalued by up to 30% compared to the pound sterling, keeping food prices and British farmers' incomes artificially low.

On 23 January 1978, following a campaign by the National Farmers Union (NFU) that was opposed by the trades unions and other interests, the Callaghan Government was defeated in a vote in the House of Commons when a Conservative amendment to devalue the green pound by 7.5%, rather than the 5% devaluation proposed by the Government, was passed with the support of other opposition parties and some Labour backbenchers. Cabinet papers later revealed that the Government considered that a 5% devaluation was the minimum necessary to stem the decline in the UK's beef and pig sector in the face of competition from Danish bacon and Irish pork, potentially saving several thousand jobs, but that this was forecast to increase the cost of food by 1%. In practice, the Government applied the devaluation selectively and in stages, with an initial 5% devaluation applying to livestock only.

The value of the green pound went on to become an issue in the 1979 General election as well as featuring in manifestos at the following elections.

In February 1989 Sir Simon Gourlay, President of the NFU, attacked the Thatcher government for maintaining the level of the green pound while sterling fell, a call he repeated a year later.

From 2 August 1993, all green rates were subject to automatic adjustments linked to market exchange rates. Between 1992 and 1995 the green pound was devalued by over 20%, raising Common Agricultural Policy prices by over 27%.

Between November 1996 and May 1998 the value of the green pound increased by nearly 20% as it was revalued five times as sterling strengthened, with the Bank of England observing that this had caused 'severe problems' in the agricultural sector. The series of rises included an unprecedented increase of 5.4% on 21 January 1997, resulting in a reduction of 5.2% in support prices.

The green pound ended with the introduction of the euro in 1999, since when all payments have been based on the euro exchange rate.

== See also ==
- Agriculture in the United Kingdom
- Bretton Woods system
- List of Government defeats in the House of Commons
