= European Unit of Account =

Monetary unit used from 1975 to 1979

The European Unit of Account (EUA) was a unit of account most notably used in the European Communities from 1975 to 1979, when it was replaced at parity by the European Currency Unit (ECU), in turn replaced at parity in 1999 by the euro.

== History ==
The EUA was introduced as the internal unit of account for the European Payments Union when that organisation was formed in 1950. The EUA was defined as 0.888671 grams of gold, or one US dollar. The unit was first used outside the EPU in 1961, when Kredietbank Luxembourgeoise issued a bond denominated in EUA. After the collapse of the Bretton Woods system, the EUA was redefined as a basket of European currencies.

The EUA was used for Lomé Convention and European Investment Bank operations before being gradually introduced into other sectors of Community activity.

The EUA basket was designed to have the same value in mid-1974 as the IMF special drawing rights basket, both worth US$1.20635; they immediately moved apart in value. Different units of account had previously been used for different purposes, including the budget, the European Coal and Steel Community, and the Common Agriculture Policy following the abandonment of the gold parity unit of account in the early 1970s in the wake of the collapse of the Bretton Woods system.

== Bond market baskets of currencies ==
Various European currency baskets were used as units of account in international bond markets. Some of these were defined in ISO 4217.ISO 4217 Standard definition:

- "Data Standards, ISO 4217 - Currency Code Maintenance: Get the Correct Currency Code". www.six-group.com. SIX Group. 2022-10-01.
- "List One: Currency, fund and precious metal codes" (XLS). www.six-group.com. SIX Group. 2022-09-23.
- "List Two: Fund codes registered with the Maintenance Agency" (XLS). www.six-group.com. SIX Group. 2018-08-29.
- "List Three: Codes for historic denominations of currencies and funds" (XLS). www.six-group.com. SIX Group. 2018-08-22.
- "Overview Amendments" (XLSX). www.six-group.com. SIX Group. 2022-09-23.

European currency baskets and ISO 4217
Name	Alphabetic code	Numeric code	Era
European Composite Unit (EURCO)	XBA	955	Active
European Monetary Unit (E.M.U.-6)	XBB	956	Active
European Unit of Account 9 (E.U.A.-9)	XBC	957	Active
European Unit of Account 17 (E.U.A.-17)	XBD	958	Active
European Unit of Account (EUA)	—		1975–1978
European Currency Unit (ECU)	XEU	954	1978–1981
Euro	EUR	978	1998–
