= Gold parity unit of account =

European unit of account, 1958 – early 1970s

The gold parity unit of account was the unit of account used by the European Coal and Steel Community (ECSC) from 1958, and in the European Economic Community from 1962 until the early 1970s. The unit was fixed to the value of gold under the Bretton Woods system, and was equivalent to the US dollar which the ECSC had previously used.

After the collapse of the Bretton Woods system, more than one unit of account was used until the European Unit of Account (EUA) was eventually adopted as a universal replacement from 1977. The EUA was replaced, in turn, by the European Currency Unit in 1981.
