= John Williamson (economist) =

English economist (1937–2021)

John H. Williamson
- Born: John Harold Williamson; June 7, 1937; Hereford, Herefordshire, England
- Died: April 11, 2021 (aged 83); Chevy Chase, Maryland, U.S.

Academic background
- Education: London School of Economics (BSc); Princeton University (PhD)
- Doctoral advisor: Fritz Machlup, Richard E. Quandt
- Influences: Oskar Morgenstern, William Baumol, James Tobin

Academic work
- Discipline: International economics
- Institutions: Peterson Institute for International Economics, World Bank, International Monetary Fund
- Doctoral students: Oliver Hart
- Notable ideas: Washington Consensus
- Website: www.piie.com/experts/former-research-staff/john-williamson; Information at IDEAS / RePEc

John Harold Williamson (June 7, 1937 – April 11, 2021) was a British-born economist who coined the term Washington Consensus. He served as a senior fellow at the Peterson Institute for International Economics from 1981 until his retirement in 2012. During that time, he was the project director for the United Nations High-Level Panel on Financing for Development in 2001. He was also on leave as chief economist for South Asia at the World Bank during 1996–99, adviser to the International Monetary Fund from 1972 to 1974, and an economic consultant to the UK Treasury from 1968 to 1970. He was also an economics professor at Pontifícia Universidade Católica do Rio de Janeiro (1978–81), University of Warwick (1970–77), Massachusetts Institute of Technology (1967, 1980), University of York (1963–68) and Princeton University (1962–63).

He is best known for defining the "Washington Consensus" in 1989. He made 10 rules that were imposed by the World Bank, the International Monetary Fund and the US government on developing nations. He came to strongly oppose the way those recommendations were actually imposed and their use by neoliberals.

== Early life and education ==
John Harold Williamson was born in Hereford in 1937. He graduated from Hereford High School for Boys and had originally planned to study civil engineering. However, his headmaster convinced him to do economics and he decided to attend the London School of Economics. He graduated with a B.Sc. in economics in 1958.

Following graduation, Williamson served two years of compulsory military service in the Royal Air Force. He conducted operations research at the Department of the Scientific Adviser to the Air Ministry in Whitehall. He then attended graduate school at Princeton University, graduating with a Ph.D. in Economics in 1963. He was influenced by courses he took with well known economists, including Oskar Morgenstern, William Baumol, and Richard E. Quandt. His dissertation, entitled "Patent Licensing and Royalty Terms", explored proposed new theoretical foundations for patent-licensing policy and royalty provisions.

== Career ==
Williamson's first academic posting was at the University of York, where he taught microeconomics. At the time, there were four other professors on the economics department: Alan T. Peacock, Jack Wiseman, John Hutton, and Douglas Dosser. In his fourth year at York, Williamson became a visiting professor in the department of economics, Massachusetts Institute of Technology (MIT), where he worked alongside Joseph Stiglitz, Charles Kindleberger, Paul Samuelson, and Tony Atkinson.

In October 1968, Williamson was appointed an adviser to the H.M. Treasury. He was in charge of overseeing relations with the European Economic Community, particularly France. He developed new forecasts on how British export markets were predicted to expand following various policy recommendations. There was also a committee, chaired by Sir Douglas Allen, that formed British views on international monetary reform. Exchange rates were the main focus of the Treasury, as the IMF's Special Drawing Rights had recently been introduced.

While serving at the Treasury, Williamson was offered chairs in economics from the University of Manchester, University of Nottingham, and the University of Warwick. He ultimately accepted the latter because he was attracted to the theories and research at newer universities. There he became Honorary Professor and taught courses in international economics and macroeconomics. While at Warwick, Williamson took a leave of absence to serve as an adviser to the International Monetary Fund. He replaced Fred Hirsch as senior adviser. After two years, he returned to Warwick where he published The Failure of World Monetary Reform, 1971–74 (1977). In this capacity, he gained an international reputation for his contributions to the field. The Brazilian Institute of Geography and Statistics (Instituto Brasileiro de Geografia e Estatística) offered him a post to begin its graduate program in economics. He offered insights into the reasons for Brazil's inflationary environment, beginning the country's path to successful stabilization in 1995.

After serving as visiting professor of economics at Pontifícia Universidade Católica do Rio de Janeiro, Williamson joined the-then Institute for International Economics as a Senior Fellow in 1981. There, he further developed research on international monetary cooperation. He also published a textbook, The Exchange-Rate System; The Open Economy and the World Economy (1983). He joined the first cohort of scholars at the institute, working alongside William Cline and Gary Hufbauer.

== Research ==
Williamson is the author or editor of over 40 books on international monetary and developing-world debt issues. He has authored/co-authored 56 journal articles, and has been cited around 2,000 times according to Google Scholar. He is ranked by IDEAS RePEc publications monitor in 2019 as among the 2,000 most influential economists of the world of all time.

=== Exchange rates ===
Much of Williamson's early career focused on developing a theory of the crawling peg. He has since stated that his primary contribution to the discipline has been his research on exchange rates. The system entailed gradual devaluations of the currency, changing expectations that the currency will devalue and interest rates would be sufficiently high to compensate bondholders. His proposal contrasted with the existing adjustable peg, in which the rate is pegged in the short run. His theories on the crawling peg were well received among economists. Sir Roy Harrod of Christ Church, Oxford University offered him a prestigious post, which Williamson declined. During the early 1970s, Williamson was involved in working with the Committee of Twenty for devising the IMF's strategy to comprehensive systemic reforms. He has continued to modify his theories of intermediate exchange rates with new proposals on monitoring bands and reference rates.

During the 1980s, while working at the Institute for International Economics, Williamson began exploring theories on target zones. He argued that these targets should be based on estimates of the real exchange rate, which would accommodate secular trends in productivity growth, real shocks to the economy, and new information. The main mechanism of adjustment was monetary policy, supported by direct exchange-rate intervention. He worked with Fred Bergsten, then the institute's Director, on ways of helping Latin American countries stabilize their currencies through this process. He argued that intermediate exchange-rate regimes maintain competitiveness in increasingly globalized economies, while also being politically favorable. Beginning in 1985, Williamson worked with Deputy Secretary of the Treasury Richard Darman to develop a comprehensive system of optimal exchange rates ("target zones"). At the 1987 Louvre Accord, the G-5 industrialized nations adopted a system of reference exchange rates that was influenced by proposals of C. Fred Bergsten and John Williamson for a target zone system. Research has shown that Williamson was largely correct in his assessment of altering expectations through his proposal of post-Louvre target zones. Shortly thereafter, however, the target zones were replaced due to the belief that free-floating exchange rates would have been preferred. Williamson challenged this notion through his theories on intermediate exchange rates.

For much of his academic career, he worked on a theory of "intermediate" exchange rates as an intermediate between fixed exchange rates and floating exchange rates. He was a critic of capital liberalization and the bipolar exchange rate. Rüdiger Dornbusch (MIT) summarized this proposal as a "BBC" (band, basket, and crawl). Williamson further coined the concept of “fundamental equilibrium exchange rate” (FEER) in Estimating Equilibrium Exchange Rates (1994) to describe how exchange-rate misalignments resulted in balance-of-payments crises. The IMF began using FEERs as the basis of its exchange-rate policies. There were also adoptions of FEERs in the private sector, most notably the Goldman Sachs desirable effective exchange rates (GSDEERs).

In the 1990s, Williamson continued his policy-oriented contributions. In 1996, Williamson became Chief Economist for South Asia, World Bank. He was invited by the United Nations Secretary General Kofi Annan to assess policy reform in Latin America. The project, headed by President of Mexico Ernesto Zedillo, involved assessing options for expanding the roles of the World Trade Organization and the International Labour Organization. The findings of the report, the Report of the High-level Panel on Financing for Development (2001) were discussed at a subsequent conference. The panel found that to secure economic growth and equity, developing countries needed to achieve balanced budgets, ensure macroeconomic discipline, and support human capital investments. This Zedillo Report also recommended that the United Nations organize a series of climate-change conferences. In 2018, he stated that climate change was the number one concern facing economics. Following his retirement, Williamson wrote a book on growth-linked securities. It argues that, instead of fixed interest rates, certain securities should bear an interest rate that positively correlated with the growth of a country. Such an instrument would allow investors to have a vested interest in the economic growth.

=== Washington Consensus ===
In 1989, he coined the term "Washington Consensus" to describe policy reforms that the International Monetary Fund, World Bank, and U.S. Treasury advocated for emerging-market economies. The term arose from a publication, “What Washington Means by Policy Reform” (1990) that described what countries should do according to the convictions of Washington-based institutions. It became more widely known after a conference at the Institute for International Economics. Many of those who attended, including Allan Meltzer, Richard Feinberg, and Stanley Fischer, were receptive to the idea. The proposal notably received pushback from Rudi Dornbusch, who proclaimed "Williamson surrendered to Washington."

The term gained popularity and continues to be used today, both as Williamson described and in its current-day form. Critics of the Washington Consensus argue that it endorses complete free movements of capital. However, Williamson's 1989 conceptualization of the consensus only included foreign direct investment. He connected these policy recommendations to his advocacy of target zones and limited exchange-rate fluctuations. The list of ten policies involved broad policy recommendations for economic stabilization: liberalization of foreign direct investment (FDI), legal security for property rights, and trade liberalization, among others.

Since the term entered public discourse, it has been misinterpreted and distorted from its original meaning. Williamson claimed that the guidelines were meant to establish economic stability through stable institutions and cooperation. His policies had also been connected to the neoliberal policies of Ronald Reagan and Margaret Thatcher, whom he disliked. Instead, Williamson argued that these were a series of recommendations—not requirements—for Latin American countries. Some politicians, notably the former finance minister of Brazil Luiz Carlos Bresser-Pereira, recognized that the term had been used outside of the original context. He also felt that advocacy for economic stabilization through his policies were not necessarily neoliberal. He later included an updated set of policy proposals to the Washington Consensus in “What Should the World Bank Think about the Washington Consensus?” (2000). Joseph Stiglitz, former Chief Economist of the World Bank and Chair of the Council of Economic Advisers, did not object to the Washington Consensus per se, but to the neoliberal policies that policymakers have adopted. He noted, at the time, that the policies were appropriate for some Latin American countries, but not for many others. More recently, economists have recognized that the term was misconstrued from its original meaning, notably with regard to the opening of the capital account. Williamson et al. argued for prudential capital controls for developing countries through international coordination efforts. As Narcís Serra, Shari Spiegel, and Joseph E. Stiglitz, noted "the Washington Consensus has come to be associated with ‘market fundamentalism,’ the view that markets solve most, if not all, economic problems by themselves—views from which Williamson has carefully distanced himself."

In 2012, scholars debated over a new term to describe China's economic growth. Business executive Joshua Cooper Ramo coined the term Beijing Consensus to frame China's economic development as an alternative to the Washington Consensus. The three guidelines he proposed were: 1. a commitment to innovation, 2. emphasis on sustainable growth through measures alongside GDP, and 3. a policy of self-determination. In turn, Williamson argued that the Beijing Consensus comprised five major points: 1. incremental reform, 2. innovation, 3. export-led growth, 4. state capitalism, and 5. authoritarianism. In light of this change, Williamson argued Western countries should modify their policies through export-led growth, prudential capital controls, and fiscal policies.

=== Growth-linked securities ===
In 2006, Williamson published an article describing the benefits of bonds linked to the growth of a country's gross domestic product (GDP). These refer to securities where the issuer (a government) promises to pay the investor returns based on the changes to that country's GDP. In other words, the investor obtains a stake in a country's growth through this "equity-like" feature. Williamson argued that these bonds would help countries obtain stability from capital flight. The idea was also developed by other distinguished economists, including Nobel Prize Laureates Robert Shiller and Joseph Stiglitz. Williamson built on the research conducted by Shiller to discuss how, after the 2008 financial crisis and the Euro area crisis, economic stability has become all the more important.

== Personal life ==
Williamson married Denise Rosemary Rausch (b. 1940), a scholar at the Brazilian Institute of Geography and Statistics (Instituto Brasileiro de Geografia e Estatística). He has three children: André Williamson (b. 1968), Daniel (b. 1969), and Theresa (b. 1975).

In 2012, Williamson retired from the PIIE. His Festschrift, Global Economics in Extraordinary Times: Essays in Honor of John Williamson (2012), was edited by C. Fred Bergsten, former assistant to Henry Kissinger on the U.S. National Security Council and assistant secretary for international affairs at the U.S. Department of the Treasury.

Williamson resided in Chevy Chase, Maryland. He was fluent in Portuguese.

Williamson died from multiple system atrophy at his home in Chevy Chase on April 11, 2021, at age 83.

== Honors and awards ==
- Houblon-Norman Fellowship, Bank of England (2007–08)

== Publications ==
- Growth-Linked Securities (2017)
- International Monetary Reform: A Specific Set of Proposals (2015)
- Who Needs to Open the Capital Account, eds. Olivier Jeanne, Arvind Subramanian, John Williamson (2012)
- Reference Rates and the International Monetary System (2007)
- Trade Relations Between Colombia and the United States, with Jeffrey J. Schott (2006)
- Reference Rates and the International Monetary System, Curbing the Boom-Bust Cycle: Stabilizing Capital Flows to Emerging Markets (2005)
- Dollar Adjustment: How Far? Against What?, edited volume with C. Fred Bergsten (2004)
- The South Asian Experience with Growth, edited volume with Isher Judge Ahluwalia (2003)
- After the Washington Consensus: Restarting Growth and Reform in Latin America, with Pedro Pablo Kuczynski (2003)
- Delivering on Debt Relief: From IMF Gold to a New Aid Architecture, with Nancy Birdsall (2002)
- Exchange Rate Regimes for Emerging Markets: Reviving the Intermediate Option, with Theodore H. Moran (2000)
- A Survey of Financial Liberalization, with Molly Mahar (1998)
- The Crawling Band as an Exchange Rate Regime (1996)
- What Role for Currency Boards? (1995)
- Pension Funds, Capital Controls and Macroeconomic Stability, with Helmut Reisen (1994)
- Estimating Equilibrium Exchange Rates (edited volume) (1994)
- The G-7's Joint-and-Several Blunder, with Beatriz Armendariz de Aghion (1993)
- The Political Economy of Policy Reform (edited volume) (1993)
- The Economic Consequences of Soviet Disintegration (edited volume) (1993)
- Trade and Payments After Soviet Disintegration (1992)
- From Soviet Disunion to Eastern Economic Community?, with Oleh Havrylyshyn (1991)
- Currency Convertibility in Eastern Europe (edited volume) (1991)
- Latin American Adjustment: How Much Has Happened? (1990)
- Globalization: The Concept, Causes, and Consequences (1989)
- Voluntary Approaches to Debt Relief (1988)
- World Economic Problems, edited with Kimberly Ann Elliott (1988)
- Capital Flight and Third World Debt, with Donald R. Lessard (1987)
- Targets and Indicators: A Blueprint for the International Coordination of Economic Policy, with Marcus Miller (1987)
- Political Economy and International Money: Selected Essays of John Williamson, edited by Chris Milner (1987)
- Adjusting to Success: Balance of Payments Policy in the East Asian NICs, with Bela Balassa (1987)
- African Debt and Financing, edited with Carol Lancaster (1986)
- Inflation and Indexation: Argentina, Brazil, and Israel (edited volume) (1985)
- Bank Lending to Developing Countries: The Policy Alternatives, with C. Fred Bergsten and William R. Cline (1985)
- A New SDR Allocation? (1984)
- IMF Conditionality, (edited volume) (1983)
- The Lending Policies of the International Monetary Fund (1982)
- Exchange Rate Rules: The Theory, Performance, and Prospects of the Crawling Peg, (edited volume) (1981)
- The Financing Procedures of British Foreign Trade, with Stephen Carse and Geoffrey E. Wood (1980)
- The Failure of World Monetary Reform, 1971-74 (1977)
- The Choice of a Pivot for Parities (1971)
- How to Stop Stop-Go (1966)
- The Crawling Peg (1965)

== Interviews ==
- "The World According to John Williamson: Part I", Peterson Perspectives (2012) Link
- William Becker, "Transcript of Interview with John Williamson", The World Bank Group Archives: Oral History Program (2006) Link
- Global Economics in Extraordinary Times: Essays in Honor of John Williamson, eds. John Williamson, C. Fred Bergsten, C. Randall Henning, and Stanley Fischer (2012) Link
- Kurt Schuler, Theresa Williamson, and Robert Yee, "The Washington Consensus in History: An Interview with John Williamson", Center for Financial Stability: Papers in Financial History (2020) Link
