= Impossible trinity =

Trilemma in international economics

The Impossible Trinity or "The Trilemma", in which two policy positions are possible. If a nation were to adopt position a, for example, then it would maintain a fixed exchange rate and allow free capital flows, the consequence of which would be loss of monetary sovereignty.

In international economics and international political economy, the impossible trinity (also known as the trilemma, the monetary trilemma or the Unholy Trinity) is the view that it is impossible to have all three of the following at the same time:

- a fixed foreign exchange rate
- free capital movement (absence of capital controls)
- an independent monetary policy

It is both a hypothesis based on the uncovered interest rate parity condition, and a finding from empirical studies where governments that have tried to simultaneously pursue all three goals have failed. The concept was developed independently by both John Marcus Fleming in 1962 and Robert Alexander Mundell in different articles between 1960 and 1963.

Historically in advanced economies, the periods pre-1914 were characterized by stable foreign exchange rates and free capital movement, whereas monetary autonomy was limited. The period from 1950 to 1971 had restrictions on capital movement (e.g. capital controls), but exchange rate stability and monetary autonomy were present. The period since the 1970s has been characterized by floating exchange rates, free capital movement and monetary autonomy.

== Policy choices ==
According to the impossible trinity, a central bank can pursue only two of the above-mentioned three policies simultaneously. To see why, consider this example (which abstracts from risk but this is not essential to the basic point):

Assume that world interest rate is at 5%. If the home central bank tries to set domestic interest rate at a rate lower than 5%, for example at 2%, there will be a depreciation pressure on the home currency, because investors would want to sell their low yielding domestic currency and buy higher yielding foreign currency. If the central bank also wants to have free capital flows, the only way the central bank could prevent depreciation of the home currency is to sell its foreign currency reserves. Since foreign currency reserves of a central bank are limited, once the reserves are depleted, the domestic currency will depreciate.

Hence, all three of the policy objectives mentioned above cannot be pursued simultaneously. A central bank has to forgo one of the three objectives. Therefore, a central bank has three policy combination options.

=== Options ===
In terms of the diagram above (Oxelheim, 1990), the options are:

1. A stable exchange rate and free capital flows (but not an independent monetary policy because setting a domestic interest rate that is different from the world interest rate would undermine a stable exchange rate due to appreciation or depreciation pressure on the domestic currency).
2. An independent monetary policy and free capital flows (but not a stable exchange rate).
3. A stable exchange rate and independent monetary policy (but no free capital flows, which would require the use of capital controls).

Currently, Eurozone members have chosen the first option (a) after the introduction of the euro. By contrast, Harvard economist Dani Rodrik advocates the use of the third option (c) in his book The Globalization Paradox, emphasising that world GDP grew fastest during the Bretton Woods era when capital controls were accepted in mainstream economics. Rodrik also argues that the expansion of financial globalization and the free movement of capital flows are the reason why economic crises have become more frequent in both developing and advanced economies alike. Rodrik has also developed the political trilemma of the world economy where "democracy, national sovereignty and global economic integration are mutually incompatible: we can combine any two of the three, but never have all three simultaneously and in full."

== Theoretical derivation ==
The formal model underlying the hypothesis is the uncovered Interest Rate Parity condition which states that in absence of a risk premium, arbitrage will ensure that the depreciation or appreciation of a country's currency vis-à-vis another will be equal to the nominal interest rate differential between them. Since under a peg, i.e. a fixed exchange rate, short of devaluation or abandonment of the fixed rate, the model implies that the two countries' nominal interest rates will be equalized. An example of which was the consequential devaluation of the Mexican peso, that during the Peso crisis was pegged to the US dollar at 0.08, eventually depreciating by 46%. This in turn implies that the country implementing the peg has no ability to set its nominal interest rate independently, and hence no independent monetary policy. The only way then that the country could have both a fixed exchange rate and an independent monetary policy is if it can prevent arbitrage in the foreign exchange rate market from taking place – by instituting capital controls on international transactions.

== Trilemma in practice ==
The idea of the impossible trinity went from theoretical curiosity to becoming the foundation of open economy macroeconomics in the 1980s, by which time capital controls had broken down in many countries and the conflict between pegged exchange rates and monetary policy autonomy became apparent. While one version of the impossible trinity is focused on the extreme case—given a perfectly fixed exchange rate and a perfectly open capital account, a country would have no autonomous monetary policy—the real world has thrown up repeated examples where the capital controls are loosened, resulting in greater exchange rate rigidity and less monetary-policy autonomy.

In 1997, Maurice Obstfeld and Alan M. Taylor brought the term "trilemma" into widespread use within economics. In work with Jay Shambaugh, they developed the first methods to empirically validate this central, yet hitherto untested, hypothesis in international macroeconomics.

Economists Michael C. Burda and Charles Wyplosz provide an illustration of what can happen if a nation tries to pursue all three goals at once. To start with they posit a nation with a fixed exchange rate at equilibrium with respect to capital flows as its monetary policy is aligned with the international market. However, the nation then adopts an expansionary monetary policy in order to try to stimulate its domestic economy.

This involves an increase of the monetary supply, and a fall of the domestically available interest rate. Because the internationally available interest rate adjusted for foreign exchange differences has not changed, market participants are able to make a profit by borrowing in the country's currency and then lending abroad –a form of carry trade.

In the absence of capital controls, market players will do this en masse. The trade will involve selling the borrowed currency on the foreign exchange market in order to acquire foreign currency to invest abroad – and this tends to cause the price of the nation's currency to drop due to the sudden extra supply. Because the nation has a fixed exchange rate, it must defend its currency and will sell its reserves in order to buy its currency back. However, unless the monetary policy is changed back, the international markets will invariably continue until the government's foreign exchange reserves are exhausted, (Note: In real-life examples, as the market players reach the point where they suspect the government is running out of the reserves to defend its currency, they will pile in with direct speculative attacks where they borrow and sell the nation's currency without bothering with carry trades, leading to a quick profit once the inevitable devaluation occurs.) thereby causing the currency to devalue, thus breaking one of the three goals and also enriching market players at the expense of the government that tried to break the impossible trinity.

A 2022 study of the Classical Gold Standard period found that the behavior of advanced economies to international shocks was consistent with the impossible trilemma. A 2018 study of the Asian countries also supports the trilemma hypothesis.

== Possibility of a dilemma ==
In the modern world, given the growth of trade in goods and services and the fast pace of financial innovation, it is possible that capital controls can often be evaded. In addition, capital controls introduce numerous distortions. Hence, there are few important countries with an effective system of capital controls, though by early 2010, there has been a movement among economists, policy makers and the International Monetary Fund back in favour of limited use. Lacking effective control on the free movement of capital, the impossible trinity asserts that a country has to choose between reducing currency volatility and running a stabilising monetary policy: it cannot do both. As stated by Paul Krugman in 1999:

The point is that you can't have it all: A country must pick two out of three. It can fix its exchange rate without emasculating its central bank, but only by maintaining controls on capital flows (like China today); it can leave capital movement free but retain monetary autonomy, but only by letting the exchange rate fluctuate (like Britain – or Canada); or it can choose to leave capital free and stabilize the currency, but only by abandoning any ability to adjust interest rates to fight inflation or recession (like Argentina today, (Note: Note that this was written in 1999, when Argentina had a fixed exchange rate. Argentina abandoned this in January 2002. See Argentine economic crisis (1999–2002)) or for that matter most of Europe).

== Historical events ==
The combination of the three policies – fixed exchange rate, free capital flow, and independent monetary policy – is known to cause financial crisis. The Mexican peso crisis (1994–1995), the 1997 Asian financial crisis (1997–1998), and the Argentinean financial collapse (2001–2002) are often cited as examples.

In particular, the East Asian crisis (1997–1998) is widely known as a large-scale financial crisis caused by the combination of the three policies which violate the impossible trinity. The East Asian countries were taking a de facto dollar peg (fixed exchange rate), promoting the free movement of capital (free capital flow) and making independent monetary policy at the same time. First, because of the de facto dollar peg, foreign investors could invest in Asian countries without the risk of exchange rate fluctuation. Second, the free flow of capital kept foreign investment uninhibited. Third, the short-term interest rates of Asian countries were higher than the short-term interest rate of the United States from 1990 to 1999. For these reasons, many foreign investors invested enormous amounts of money in Asian countries and reaped huge profits. While the Asian countries' trade balance was favorable, the investment was pro-cyclical for the countries. But when the Asian countries' trade balance shifted, investors quickly retrieved their money, triggering the Asian crisis. Eventually countries such as Thailand ran out of dollar reserves and were forced to let their currencies float and devalue. Since many short-term debt obligations were denoted in US dollars, debts grew substantially and many businesses had to shut down and declare bankruptcy. The disorderly collapse of fixed exchange rate regimes in Asia was anticipated in Obstfeld and Rogoff, who showed that empirically almost no fixed exchange rate regime had survived five years once the capital account was opened.

== See also ==
- Capital controls
- Fixed exchange rate
- Floating exchange rate
- Inconsistent triad
- Liberal paradox
- Mundell–Fleming model
- Political trilemma of the world economy
- Triffin dilemma
