= Financial repression =

Policies resulting in savers earning returns below the rate of inflation

Financial repression refers to government implementation of policies to channel domestic funds to the public sector that in a deregulated market environment would go elsewhere. These policies are used to reduce the government's debt-to-GDP ratio.

The term was introduced in 1973 by Stanford economists Edward S. Shaw and Ronald I. McKinnon to refer to well-intentioned but counterproductive policies that might impair a country’s economic development.

== Mechanism ==
Financial repression may consist of any of the following, alone or in combination:

1. Explicit or indirect capping of interest rates, such as on government debt and deposit rates (e.g., Regulation Q).
2. Government ownership or control of domestic banks and financial institutions with barriers that limit other institutions from entering the market.
3. High reserve requirements.
4. Creation or maintenance of a captive domestic market for government debt, achieved by requiring banks to hold government debt via capital requirements, or by prohibiting or disincentivising alternatives.
5. Government restrictions on the transfer of assets abroad through the imposition of capital controls.

These measures allow governments to issue debt at lower interest rates. A low nominal interest rate can reduce debt servicing costs, while negative real interest rates erodes the real value of government debt. Thus, financial repression is most successful in liquidating debts when accompanied by inflation and can be considered a form of taxation, or alternatively a form of debasement.

A 1993 study estimated the size of the financial repression tax for 24 emerging markets from 1974 to 1987. The results found that financial repression exceeded 2% of GDP for seven countries, and greater than 3% for five countries. For five countries (India, Mexico, Pakistan, Sri Lanka, and Zimbabwe) it represented approximately 20% of tax revenue. In the case of Mexico financial repression was estimated at 6% of GDP, or 40% of tax revenue.

Financial repression is categorized as "macroprudential regulation"—i.e., government efforts to "ensure the health of an entire financial system.

== Examples ==
=== After World War II ===
Financial repression "played an important role in reducing debt-to-GDP ratios after World War II." By keeping real interest rates for government debt below 1% for two-thirds of the time between 1945 and 1980, the United States was able to "inflate away" the large debt (122% of GDP) left over from the Great Depression and World War II. In the UK, government debt declined from 216% of GDP in 1945 to 138% ten years later in 1955.

In the case of Japan, research suggests that financial repression can last for decades.

=== China ===
China's economic growth has been attributed to financial repression thanks to "low returns on savings and the cheap loans that it makes possible". This has allowed China to rely on savings-financed investments for economic growth. However, because low returns also dampen consumer spending, household expenditures account for "a smaller share of GDP in China than in any other major economy". However, as of December 2014, the People’s Bank of China "started to undo decades of financial repression" and the government now allows Chinese savers to collect up to a 3.3% return on one-year deposits. At China's 1.6% inflation rate, this is a "high real-interest rate compared to other major economies".

=== After the 2008 economic recession ===
In a 2011 NBER working paper, Carmen Reinhart and Maria Belen Sbrancia speculate on a possible return by governments to this form of debt reduction in order to deal with high debt levels following the 2008 financial crisis.

"To get access to capital, Austria has restricted capital flows to foreign subsidiaries in central and eastern Europe. Select pension funds have also been transferred to governments in France, Portugal, Ireland and Hungary, enabling them to re-allocate toward sovereign bonds."

== Criticism ==
Financial repression has been criticized as a theory, by those who think the concept does not do a good job of explaining real world conditions, and also criticized as a policy, by those who think it does exist but is inadvisable.

Critics argue that if this view was true, borrowers (i.e., capital-seeking parties) would be inclined to demand capital in large quantities and would be buying capital goods from this capital. This high demand for capital goods would certainly lead to inflation and thus the central banks would be forced to raise interest rates again. As a boom pepped by low interest rates fails to appear in the time period from 2008 until 2020 in industrialized countries, this is a sign that the low interest rates seemed to be necessary to ensure an equilibrium on the capital market, thus to balance capital-supply—i.e., savers—on one side and capital-demand—i.e., investors and the government—on the other. This view argues that interest rates would be even lower if it were not for the high government debt ratio (i.e., capital demand from the government).

Free-market economists argue that financial repression crowds out private-sector investment, thus undermining growth. On the other hand, "postwar politicians clearly decided this was a price worth paying to cut debt and avoid outright default or draconian spending cuts. And the longer the gridlock over fiscal reform rumbles on, the greater the chance that 'repression' comes to be seen as the least of all evils".

Also, financial repression has been called a "stealth tax" that "rewards debtors and punishes savers—especially retirees" because their investments will no longer generate the expected return, which is income for retirees. "One of the main goals of financial repression is to keep nominal interest rates lower than they would be in more competitive markets. Other things equal, this reduces the government’s interest expenses for a given stock of debt and contributes to deficit reduction. However, when financial repression produces negative real interest rates (nominal rates below the inflation rate), it reduces or liquidates existing debts and becomes the equivalent of a tax—a transfer from creditors (savers) to borrowers, including the government."

== See also ==
- Banking regulation
- Bank reserves
- Capital controls
- Debasement
- De-banking
- Economic repression
- Financial regulation
- Hidden tax
- Inflation tax
- Indirect tax
- Internal devaluation
- Macroprudential policy
- Oppression
- Political repression
- Sovereign debt
- Taxation as theft
