= Prudential capital controls =

Financial regulation that aims to mitigate risk to the financial system as a whole

Prudential capital controls are ways of financial regulation that aim to mitigate risk to the financial system as a whole, usually taking the form of residency-based measures such as transaction taxes, other limits, or outright prohibitions that a nation's government can use to regulate flows from capital markets into and out of the country's capital account. Prudential capital controls aim to mitigate systemic risk, reduce business cycle volatility, increase macroeconomic stability, and enhance social welfare.

== Distinctions from capital controls in general ==
The term “prudential” distinguishes such typical capital control measures from other general capital controls by emphasizing both the motive of “prudence” and the ex-ante timing. Firstly, the prudence motivation requirement says that such regulation should curb and manage the excessive risk accumulation process with cautious forethoughts for the purpose of preventing an emerging financial crisis and economic collapse. Secondly, the ex-ante timing means that such regulation should be taken effectively before the realization of any unfettered crisis as opposed to taking policy interventions after a severe crisis already hits the economy. In addition, prudential capital controls only apply to capital inflows because the excessive risk accumulation process that intrinsically creates the domestic financial vulnerability is usually associated with capital inflow rather than outflow. Neely (1999) summarized some other nonprudential ways of exercising capital controls. For example, restrictions on the volume and price for domestic currency and financial asset transactions, requirements for administrative approval of capital outflow, or limits on the amount of money that a citizen is allowed to take out of the country.

== History ==
The history of capital free flows and controls unfolds with the history of financial globalization. At the onset, capital moved freely across borders during the Gold Standard period before World War I. After World War II, owing to the suspicion that a country's macroeconomic instability could be due to the volatile capital flows, capital flows were deliberately managed under a variety of administrative controls as part of the governance in the international monetary Bretton Woods system.

Starting from early 1970s, increasingly relaxed capital controls along with the adoptions of floating exchange rate regime worldwide, though in the midst of concerns, announced the collapse of the Bretton Woods. Roughly from 1990s to 2009 known as the Washington Consensus period, it was widely accepted that the economic prosperity in the emerging market economies was attributed to the liberalization of their capital accounts and the increasing capital inflow. Then the policy prescriptions for these countries were that capital controls should be loosened and eventually abandoned.

The pro-capital flow arguments were not reviewed and critiqued until the Great Recession in the late 2000s. Emerging markets experienced strong capital inflows in the boom stage of a business cycle whereas they witnessed huge flow reverse and financial collapse in the bust period. This boom and bust cycles in international capital flows imposed significant welfare costs. Then the theoretical underpinnings of the Great Recession crisis mechanism give a role for the prudential capital controls as an intervention to adjust the market imperfections in order to mitigate the systemic boom-bust cycle effects brought by the international capital flows

== Theoretical paradigms for prudential regulations ==
To justify the necessity of the external regulation, market imperfections of a free market economy must be identified as socially inefficient and adjustable in the sense of pareto improving. Three different theoretical paradigms can be used to illustrate the market imperfections and to introduce the role of prudential regulations: 1. The Agency Paradigm; 2. The Mood Swing Paradigm. 3. The Externality Paradigm. The Prudential Capital Controls, as a particular form of prudential regulations, builds its theory foundation heavily on the paradigm of externalities.

The Agency paradigm highlights various forms of principal-agent problems. An example is a moral hazard problem: considered as lender of last resort and provider of deposit insurance, government induces the under-regulated banks to take excessive risks which creates the financial vulnerability. The moral hazard problem occurs in both the individual level and in a collective fashion, which justifies the prudential regulations.

In the Mood Swing paradigm, investors’ and consumers’ animal spirit induces an overly optimistic mood in good times of tracing the mispriced asset price signals, which accumulates excessive risk that runs down the financial system and the economy when there is a bad shock. Then ex-ante macroprudential regulations can play a role to manage overall mood and alert the risks.

== Justification ==
Based on the Externality Paradigm, prudential capital controls, as one of the prudential regulations, are called to deal with the typical market imperfection known as the pecuniary externality in an open economy in order to curb the destabilizing effects of capital flows on domestic financial market.

=== Pecuniary externality and market incompleteness ===
The key market imperfection, the pecuniary externality, is defined as a particular form of externality that a private agent's optimal decision affects the welfare of another agent through prices. Other market distortions, such as the incomplete markets in which private agents cannot fully insure their idiosyncratic risks, the information asymmetry and limited commitment by which lenders do not know whether or not the borrowers will default and thus have collateral requirements on the borrowers, could aggravate the role of pecuniary externality. When applied to the open economy context with incomplete markets that involves external borrowing and collateral constraint, the pecuniary externality can be used to explain the stylized fact of an open economy's excessive borrowing from outside the country as seen by overly large amount of capital inflow: small, rational and individual domestic private agents take as given the exchange rates and asset prices that determine the external borrowing limit, but they do not internalize the price effects of their individual actions that their joint behavior could determine the level of exchange rates and asset prices and hence the degree of financial fragility in the economy. In other words, private agents take too much risk. Then their aggregate borrowing exceeds the socially efficient level so that the risk of a financial systemic collapse is created and it could potentially lead to a financial crisis and economic downturn.

Financial Amplification Feedback Loop

=== Financial amplification effects ===
Such a problem of excessive borrowing rooted on the pecuniary externality and market incompleteness can be much more severe when some financial amplification mechanism is present: For example, some negative shocks on the aggregate demand could lead to the real depreciation and the fall of domestic asset prices, which brings about the incipient adverse balance sheet effects that decrease the firm net worth and value of collateral. Consequently, the shrink of collateral value further constrains the private agents’ accesses to external borrowing through the binding borrowing constraint, which in turn results in the economy-wise spending cut and initial aggregate demand contraction is thus amplified. As shown in the graph depicting such a loop of effects, it is even striking that adverse shock on any step of this feedback loop could trigger this amplification of initial negative effects. Hence the overly large inflow of capital would potentially create a systemic risk and activate the amplification mechanism, which ultimately would generate large business cycle volatility, sudden collapse of the financial system and the economic recessions only given such a small incipient adverse shock on the feedback loop.

=== Policy interventions ===
To curb the amplification mechanism, mitigating the pecuniary externality that results in the excessive risk-taking and excessive capital inflow for an open economy is the key, As proved by Greenwald and Stiglitz (1986), in the presence of pecuniary externality and market incompleteness, some policy intervention that aims to reduce the pecuniary externality problem could achieve larger social benefits while incur only small social cost. This justifies the role for external intervention. In the case of excessive external borrowing problem in the open economy, the prudential capital controls are the desired regulations that kick in to induce private agents to internalize the externality and to reduce the excessive risk-taking exposures.

== Optimal policy exercises ==
Classic textbook policy recommendation that deals with externalities includes variations of Pigouvian Tax.

=== Pigouvian taxation ===
Pigouvian type of taxation can be introduced to induce private agents to internalize their contributions to the systemic risk so as to improve the social welfare with only small magnitude of social cost incurred. In reality, the appropriate intervention does not have to be in the form of taxation. Restricting certain types of capital inflow or creating market to trade permits of liability issuance could be other forms of implementable policies. However, all the policies in a reduced form amount to take some effective Pigouvian Taxation to optimally control the capital inflow. It is argued that a straightforward tax on capital inflows is the best form of capital controls.

Magnitude of Externalities for Different Types of Capital Inflows

=== Differentiated controls and optimal magnitude ===
The prudential capital controls should differentiate the types of capital inflow based on their contributions to the systemic risk. Since different forms of capital inflow would result in different probabilities of future capital outflows with different payoff characteristics in the event of a crisis, thus they lead to different degrees of negative externality. In the case of an emerging market economy, Korinek (2010) found that dollar debt imposes a larger negative externality, followed by CPI-indexed debt that hedges against the exchange rate risk as dollar debt suffers, local currency debt and portfolio investment. The non-financial foreign direct investment often stays in the country when a financial crisis occurs so that it has no externalities. In other words, the pigouvian tax should be set equal to the magnitude of the externalities of different inflow types. Based on Korinek's (2010) estimated the optimal annual magnitude of externalities for various types of capital inflows for Indonesia. As the graph shows, the magnitude of externalities confirms the indicated order of magnitude for different types. Long run average indicates an average magnitude of externalities for the past 20 years. And red bars capture the magnitude during the 1997-1998 Asian Crisis. It is clear that externalities of foreign capital inflow rise during booms and leverages were built up. After a crisis, the externalities are smaller once the economy was de-leveraged. Therefore, the magnitude of optimal tax should be time-variant which depends on the financial vulnerability over business cycles. The optimal tax rates should be tighter during the boom and lowered even to zero during the bust.

== Evidence from Peru ==
During roughly the period of the first quarter in 2000 to the second quarter in 2008, Peru took some conventional controls on capital inflow and outflows along with prudential capital control measures as listed below:

1. The average reserve requirement on foreign exchange deposits was reduced by 3 percentage points, and the mandatory minimum reserve requirement was lowered to 6 percent from 7 percent in 2004. Reserve requirements were increased from February 2008.
2. The minimum unremunerated reserve requirement for both domestic and foreign currencies was increased from 6 percent to 9 percent by November 2008 and reduced to 7.5 percent a month later.
3. The marginal reserve requirement on banks’ foreign currency liabilities was raised from 20 percent in 2004 to 50 percent in September 2008. The marginal reserve requirement for domestic currency deposits of residents and nonresidents was increased from zero to 15 percent in February 2008.
4. The rate of remuneration on the reserve requirements in foreign currency was gradually increased from 2005 to 2007.
5. Banks were required to make additional provisions if “unhedged” borrowers were not properly identified or adequate provisions had not been already established for foreign currency loans. in 2006, and they were required to consider in their lending decisions the overall exposure of borrowers with the entire financial system.
6. Prudential limits were set on government securities in pension funds portfolios in May 2008.

As a result, these measures helped ease the appreciation pressures, significantly reduced net inflows, slowed credit expansion and lengthened the maturity of capital inflows. However, it was recognized that Peru was one of the very few cases that prudential capital control measures were indeed effective. Other countries who ever took the prudential measures on capital controls are Croatia, Korea, Romania, Colombia, Thailand and Philippines etc.

== Effectiveness and evaluating empirics ==
It could be extremely hard to identify the “true” causal links between the prudential capital controls and the economic stability, financial development and economic growth with the conventional econometric tools. Therefore, the empirical evidences can be hard to directly infer on the effectiveness of prudential capital controls not to mention the mixed findings themselves. For example, if the reduced volatility could be explained by prudential inflow measures, then the reversed causality can be still valid since the more developed domestic capital markets with smaller fluctuations could also temper foreign investors’ incentive to inject capital inflow due to smaller interest differential. A few key findings to shed lights on the effectiveness of the prudential capital controls measures are listed below. Some are unambiguously positive, some mixed and some contingent on covariates:

1. Prudential measures contributed to mitigating the macroeconomic impact of capital inflows in some cases.
2. Targeted prudential measures often appear to be effective in reducing credit growth.
3. The effectiveness of prudential measures often depends on the accompanying macroeconomic policies.
4. Adding capital inflow controls to prudential measures often seems to have little additional effect on credit growth.
5. The effectiveness of prudential measures in reducing foreign currency lending is mixed.
6. Prudential measures usually did little to restrain asset prices.
7. Prudential measures have helped to address some other financial stability concerns.

== See also ==
- Capital controls
- Financial accelerator
- Macroprudential regulation
- Financial regulation
