= Capital control =

Monetary policy limiting transfer of assets in or out of a country

Capital controls are residency-based measures such as transaction taxes, other limits, or outright prohibitions that a nation's government can use to regulate flows from capital markets into and out of the country's capital account. These measures may be economy-wide, sector-specific (usually the financial sector), or industry specific (e.g. "strategic" industries). They may apply to all flows, or may differentiate by type or duration of the flow (debt, equity, or direct investment, and short-term vs. medium- and long-term).

Types of capital control include exchange controls that prevent or limit the buying and selling of a national currency at the market rate, caps on the allowed volume for the international sale or purchase of various financial assets, transaction taxes such as the proposed Tobin tax on currency exchanges, minimum stay requirements, requirements for mandatory approval, or even limits on the amount of money a private citizen is allowed to remove from the country. There have been several shifts of opinion on whether capital controls are beneficial and in what circumstances they should be used. Capital controls were an integral part of the Bretton Woods system which emerged after World War II and lasted until the early 1970s. This period was the first time capital controls had been endorsed by mainstream economics. Capital controls were relatively easy to impose, in part because international capital markets were less active in general. In the 1970s, economic liberal, free-market economists became increasingly successful in persuading their colleagues that capital controls were in the main harmful. The US, other Western governments, and multilateral financial institutions such as the International Monetary Fund (IMF) and the World Bank began to take a critical view of capital controls and persuaded many countries to abandon them to facilitate financial globalization.

The Latin American debt crisis of the early 1980s, the 1997 Asian financial crisis, the 1998 Russian financial crisis, and the 2008 financial crisis highlighted the risks associated with the volatility of capital flows, and led many countries, even those with relatively open capital accounts, to make use of capital controls alongside macroeconomic and prudential policies as means to dampen the effects of volatile flows on their economies. In the aftermath of the 2008 financial crisis, as capital inflows surged to emerging market economies, a group of economists at the IMF outlined the elements of a policy toolkit to manage the macroeconomic and financial-stability risks associated with capital flow volatility. The proposed toolkit allowed a role for capital controls. The study, as well as a successor study focusing on financial-stability concerns stemming from capital flow volatility, while not representing an IMF official view, were nevertheless influential in generating debate among policy makers and the international community, and ultimately in bringing about a shift in the institutional position of the IMF. With the increased use of capital controls in recent years, the IMF has moved to destigmatize the use of capital controls alongside macroeconomic and prudential policies to deal with capital flow volatility..

Beyond macroeconomic stabilization, the renewed reliance on capital controls reveals deeper domestic and international trade-offs. Domestically, political economy research suggests that capital controls often function as an imperfect substitute for comprehensive social protection. Studies show that countries with narrow welfare systems tend to impose stricter capital restrictions, whereas those with broad safety nets rely on them less to cushion the risks of economic openness. However, when multiple nations simultaneously deploy these controls to patch domestic vulnerabilities, it creates complex multilateral coordination challenges. The resulting cross-border spillovers highlight a persistent tension between national policy autonomy and global financial stability, echoing the foundational debates of John Maynard Keynes and Harry Dexter White and remaining a central concern for modern forums like the G-20.

== History ==
=== Pre-World War I ===
Prior to the 19th century, there was generally little need for capital controls due to low levels of international trade and financial integration. In the First Age of Globalization, which is generally dated from 1870 to 1914, capital controls remained largely absent.

=== World War I to World War II: 1914–1945 ===
Highly restrictive capital controls were introduced with the outbreak of World War I. In the 1920s they were generally relaxed, only to be strengthened again in the wake of the 1929 Great Crash. This was more an ad hoc response to potentially damaging flows rather than based on a change in normative economic theory. Economic historian Barry Eichengreen has implied that the use of capital controls peaked during World War II, but the more general view is that the most wide-ranging implementation occurred after Bretton Woods. An example of capital control in the interwar period was the Reich Flight Tax, introduced in 1931 by German Chancellor Heinrich Brüning. The tax was needed to limit the removal of capital from the country by wealthy residents. At the time, Germany was suffering economic hardship due to the Great Depression and the harsh war reparations imposed after World War I. Following the ascension of the Nazis to power in 1933, the tax was repurposed to confiscate money and property from Jews fleeing the state-sponsored antisemitism.

=== Bretton Woods era: 1945–1971 ===
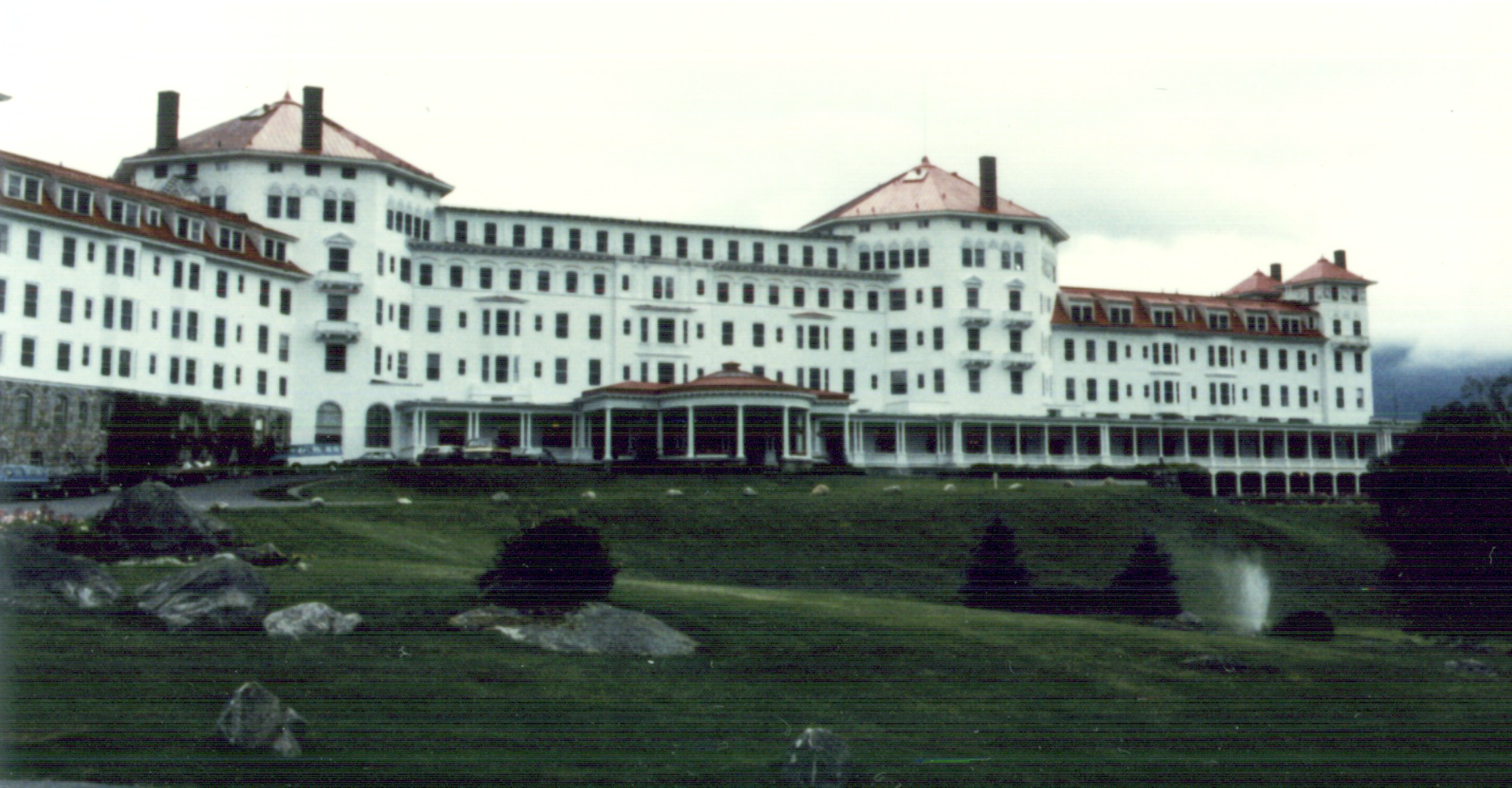
A widespread system of capital controls were decided upon at the international 1944 conference at Bretton Woods.

At the end of World War II, international capital was caged by the imposition of strong and wide-ranging capital controls as part of the newly created Bretton Woods system—it was perceived that this would help protect the interests of ordinary people and the wider economy. These measures were popular as at this time the western public's view of international bankers was generally very low, blaming them for the Great Depression. John Maynard Keynes, one of the principal architects of the Bretton Woods system, envisaged capital controls as a permanent feature of the international monetary system, though he had agreed current account convertibility should be adopted once international conditions had stabilised sufficiently. This essentially meant that currencies were to be freely convertible for the purposes of international trade in goods and services but not for capital account transactions. Most industrial economies relaxed their controls around 1958 to allow this to happen. The other leading architect of Bretton Woods, the American Harry Dexter White, and his boss Henry Morgenthau, were somewhat less radical than Keynes but still agreed on the need for permanent capital controls. In his closing address to the Bretton Woods conference, Morgenthau spoke of how the measures adopted would drive "the usurious money lenders from the temple of international finance".

Following the Keynesian Revolution, the first two decades after World War II saw little argument against capital controls from economists, though an exception was Milton Friedman. From the late 1950s, the effectiveness of capital controls began to break down, in part due to innovations such as the Eurodollar market. According to Dani Rodrik, it is unclear to what extent this was due to an unwillingness on the part of governments to respond effectively, as compared with an inability to do so. Eric Helleiner posits that heavy lobbying from Wall Street bankers was a factor in persuading American authorities not to subject the Eurodollar market to capital controls. From the late 1960s the prevailing opinion among economists began to switch to the view that capital controls are on the whole more harmful than beneficial.

While many of the capital controls in this era were directed at international financiers and banks, some were directed at individual citizens. In the 1960s, British individuals were at one point restricted from taking more than £50 with them out of the country for their foreign holidays. In their book This Time Is Different (2009), economists Carmen Reinhart and Kenneth Rogoff suggest that the use of capital controls in this period, even more than its rapid economic growth, was responsible for the very low level of banking crises that occurred in the Bretton Woods era. According to Barry Eichengreen, capital controls were more effective in the 1940s and 1950s than they were subsequently.

=== Post-Bretton Woods era: 1971–2009 ===
By the late 1970s, as part of the displacement of Keynesianism in favour of free-market orientated policies and theories, and the shift from the social-liberal paradigm to neoliberalism countries began abolishing their capital controls, starting between 1973 and 1974 with the US, Canada, Germany, and Switzerland, and followed by the United Kingdom in 1979. Most other advanced and emerging economies followed, chiefly in the 1980s and early 1990s. During the period spanning from approximately 1980–2009, the normative opinion was that capital controls were to be avoided except perhaps in a crisis. It was widely held that the absence of controls allowed capital to freely flow to where it is needed most, helping not only investors to enjoy good returns, but also helping ordinary people to benefit from economic growth. During the 1980s, many emerging economies decided or were coerced into following the advanced economies by abandoning their capital controls, though over 50 retained them at least partially.

The orthodox view that capital controls are typically harmful was challenged following the 1997 Asian financial crisis. Asian nations that had retained their capital controls such as India and China credited them for allowing them to escape the crisis relatively unscathed. Malaysia's prime minister Mahathir Mohamad imposed capital controls as an emergency measure in September 1998, including both strict exchange controls and limits on outflows from portfolio investments; these were found to be effective in containing the damage from the crisis. In the early 1990s, even some pro-globalization economists like Jagdish Bhagwati, and some writers in publications like The Economist, spoke out in favor of a limited role for capital controls. However, even as many developing world economies lost faith in the free market consensus, it remained strong among Western nations.

=== After the 2008 financial crisis ===
The Great Recession led to the 2008–2009 Keynesian resurgence which reversed the previously prevailing orthodoxy. During the 2008–2011 Icelandic financial crisis, the IMF proposed that capital controls on outflows should be imposed by Iceland, calling them "an essential feature of the monetary policy framework, given the scale of potential capital outflows".

In the latter half of 2009, as the global economy started to recover from the Great Recession, capital inflows to emerging market economies, especially, in Asia and Latin America, surged, raising macroeconomic and financial-stability risks. Several emerging market economies responded to these concerns by adopting capital controls or macroprudential measures; Brazil imposed a tax on the purchase of financial assets by foreigners and Taiwan restricted overseas investors from buying time deposits. The partial return to favor of capital controls is linked to a wider emerging consensus among policy makers for the greater use of macroprudential policy. According to economics journalist Paul Mason, international agreement for the global adoption of Macro prudential policy was reached at the 2009 G20 Pittsburgh summit, an agreement which Mason said had seemed impossible at the London summit which took place only a few months before.

Pro-capital control statements by various prominent economists, together with an influential staff position note prepared by IMF economists in February 2010 (Jonathan D. Ostry et al., 2010), and a follow-up note prepared in April 2011, have been hailed as an "end of an era" that eventually led to a change in the IMF's long held position that capital controls should be used only in extremis, as a last resort, and on a temporary basis. In June 2010, the Financial Times published several articles on the growing trend towards using capital controls. They noted influential voices from the Asian Development Bank and the World Bank had joined the IMF in advising there is a role for capital controls. The FT reported on the recent tightening of controls in Indonesia, South Korea, Taiwan, Brazil, and Russia. In Indonesia, recently implemented controls include a one-month minimum holding period for certain securities. In South Korea, limits have been placed on currency forward positions. In Taiwan, the access that foreigner investors have to certain bank deposits has been restricted. The FT cautioned that imposing controls has a downside including the creation of possible future problems in attracting funds.

By September 2010, emerging economies had experienced huge capital inflows resulting from carry trades made attractive to market participants by the expansionary monetary policies several large economies had undertaken over the previous two years as a response to the crisis. This has led to countries such as Brazil, Mexico, Peru, Colombia, South Korea, Taiwan, South Africa, Russia, and Poland further reviewing the possibility of increasing their capital controls as a response. In October 2010, with reference to increased concern about capital flows and widespread talk of an imminent currency war, financier George Soros has suggested that capital controls are going to become much more widely used over the next few years. Several analysts have questioned whether controls will be effective for most countries, with Chile's finance minister saying his country had no plans to use them.

In February 2011, citing evidence from new IMF research (Jonathan D. Ostry et al., 2010) that restricting short-term capital inflows could lower financial-stability risks, over 250 economists headed by Joseph Stiglitz wrote a letter to the Obama administration asking them to remove clauses from various bilateral trade agreements that allow the use of capital controls to be penalized. There was strong counter lobbying by business and so far the US administration has not acted on the call, although some figures such as Treasury secretary Tim Geithner have spoken out in support of capital controls at least in certain circumstances.

Econometric analyses undertaken by the IMF, and other academic economists found that in general countries which deployed capital controls weathered the 2008 crisis better than comparable countries which did not. In April 2011, the IMF published its first ever set of guidelines for the use of capital controls. At the 2011 G-20 Cannes summit, the G20 agreed that developing countries should have even greater freedom to use capital controls than the IMF guidelines allow. A few weeks later, the Bank of England published a paper where they broadly welcomed the G20's decision in favor of even greater use of capital controls, though they caution that compared to developing countries, advanced economies may find it harder to implement efficient controls. Not all momentum has been in favor of increased use of capital controls however. In December 2011, China partially loosened its controls on inbound capital flows, which the Financial Times described as reflecting an ongoing desire by Chinese authorities for further liberalization. India also lifted some of its controls on inbound capital in early January 2012, drawing criticism from economist Arvind Subramanian, who considers relaxing capital controls a good policy for China but not for India considering her different economic circumstances.

In September 2012, Michael W. Klein of Tufts University challenged the emergent consensus that short-term capital controls can be beneficial, publishing a preliminary study that found the measures used by countries like Brazil had been ineffective (at least up to 2010). Klein argues it was only countries with long term capital controls, such as China and India, that have enjoyed measurable protection from adverse capital flows. In the same month, Ila Patnaik and Ajay Shah of the NIPFP published an article about the permanent and comprehensive capital controls in India, which seem to have been ineffective in achieving the goals of macroeconomic policy. Other studies have found that capital controls may lower financial stability risks, while the controls Brazilian authorities adopted after the 2008 financial crisis did have some beneficial effect on Brazil itself.

Capital controls may have externalities. Some empirical studies find that capital flows were diverted to other countries as capital controls were tightened in Brazil. An IMF staff discussion note (Jonathan D. Ostry et al., 2012) explores the multilateral consequences of capital controls, and the desirability of international cooperation to achieve globally efficient outcomes. It flags three issues of potential concern. First is the possibility that capital controls may be used as a substitute for warranted external adjustment, such as when inflow controls are used to sustain an undervalued currency. Second, the imposition of capital controls by one country may deflect some capital towards other recipient countries, exacerbating their inflow problem. Third, policies in source countries (including monetary policy) may exacerbate problems faced by capital-receiving countries if they increase the volume or riskiness of capital flows. The paper posits that if capital controls are justified from a national standpoint (in terms of reducing domestic distortions), then under a range of circumstances they should be pursued even if they give rise to cross-border spillovers. If policies in one country exacerbate existing distortions in other countries, and it is costly for other countries to respond, then multilateral coordination of unilateral policies is likely to be beneficial. Coordination may require borrowers to reduce inflow controls or an agreement with lenders to partially internalize the risks from excessively large or risky outflows.

In December 2012, the IMF published a staff paper which further expanded on their recent support for the limited use of capital controls.

=== Impossible trinity trilemma ===
The history of capital controls is sometimes discussed in relation to the impossible trinity (trilemma, the unholy trinity), the finding that it is impossible for a nation's economic policy to simultaneously deliver more than two of the following three desirable macroeconomic goals, namely a fixed exchange rate, an independent monetary policy, and free movement for capital (absence of capital controls). In the First Age of Globalization, governments largely chose to pursue a stable exchange rate while allowing freedom of movement for capital. The sacrifice was that their monetary policy was largely dictated by international conditions, not by the needs of the domestic economy. In the Bretton Woods period, governments were free to have both generally stable exchange rates and independent monetary policies at the price of capital controls. The impossible trinity concept was especially influential during this era as a justification for capital controls. In the Washington Consensus period, advanced economies generally chose to allow freedom of capital and to continue maintaining an independent monetary policy while accepting a floating or semi-floating exchange rate.

== Examples since 2013 ==
=== Capital controls in the European Single Market and EFTA ===
The free flow of capital is one of the Four Freedoms of the European Single Market. Despite the progress that has been made, Europe's capital markets remain fragmented along national lines and European economies remain heavily reliant on the banking sector for their funding needs. Within the building on the Investment Plan for Europe for a closer integration of capital markets, the European Commission adopted in 2015 the Action Plan on Building a Capital Markets Union (CMU) setting out a list of key measures to achieve a true single market for capital in Europe, which deepens the existing Banking Union, because this revolves around disintermediated, market-based forms of financing, which should represent an alternative to the traditionally predominant in Europe bank-based financing channel. The project is a political signal to strengthen the European Single Market as a project of European Union (EU)'s 28 member states instead of just the Eurozone countries, and sent a strong signal to the UK to remain an active part of the EU, before Brexit.

There have been three instances of capital controls in the EU and European Free Trade Association (EFTA) since 2008, all of them triggered by banking crises.

==== Iceland (2008–2017) ====
In the 2008-2011 Icelandic financial crisis, Iceland (a member of the EFTA but not of the EU) imposed capital controls due to the collapse of its banking system. Iceland's government said in June 2015 that it planned to lift them; however, since the announced plans included a tax on taking capital out of the country, arguably they still constituted capital controls. The Icelandic government announced that capital controls had been lifted on 12 March 2017. In 2017, University of California, Berkeley, economist Jon Steinsson said that he had opposed the introduction of capital controls in Iceland during the crisis but that the experience in Iceland had made him change his mind, commenting: "The government needed to finance very large deficits. The imposition of capital controls locked a considerable amount of foreign capital in the country. It stands to reason that these funds substantially lowered the government's financing cost, and it is unlikely that the government could have done nearly as much deficit spending without capital controls."

==== Republic of Cyprus (2013–2015) ====
Cyprus, a Eurozone member state which is closely linked to Greece, imposed the Eurozone's first temporary capital controls in 2013 as part of its response to the 2012–2013 Cypriot financial crisis. These capital controls were lifted in 2015, with the last controls being removed in April 2015.

==== Greece (2015–2019) ====
Since the Greek debt crisis intensified in the 2010s decade, Greece has implemented capital controls. At the end of August, the Greek government announced that the last capital restrictions would be lifted as of 1 September 2019, about 50 months after they were introduced.

=== Capital controls outside Europe ===
==== India (2013) ====
In 2013, the Reserve Bank of India (RBI) imposed capital outflow controls due to a rapidly weakening currency. The central bank reduced direct investment in foreign assets to one-fourth of the original. It achieved this by lowering the limit on overseas remittances from $200,000 to $75,000. Special permission had to be obtained from the central bank for any exceptions to be made. The RBI reversed the measure gradually over subsequent weeks, as the Indian rupee stabilised.

== Adoption of prudential measures ==
The prudential capital controls measure distinguishes itself from the general capital controls as summarized above as it is one of the prudential regulations that aims to mitigate the systemic risk, reduce the business cycle volatility, increase the macroeconomic stability, and enhance the social welfare. It generally regulates inflows only and take ex-ante policy interventions. The prudence requirement says that such regulation should curb and manage the excessive risk accumulation process with cautious forethought to prevent an emerging financial crisis and economic collapse. The ex-ante timing means that such regulation should be taken effectively before the realization of any unfettered crisis as opposed to taking policy interventions after a severe crisis already hits the economy.

== Free movement of capital and payments ==
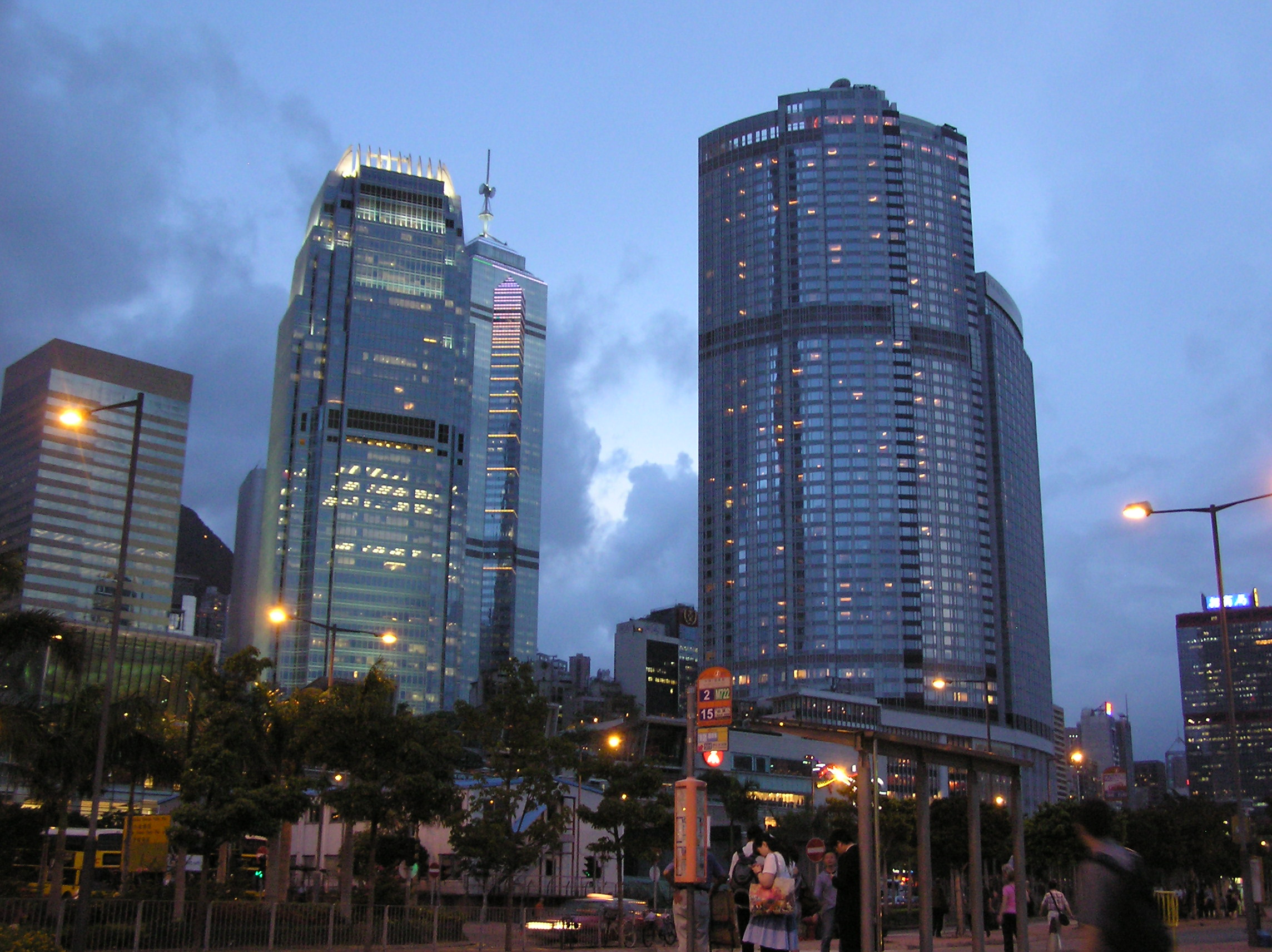
The International Finance Centre in Hong Kong would likely oppose capital controls, and argue that they would not work.

Full freedom of movement for capital and payments has so far only been approached between individual pairings of states which have free trade agreements and relative freedom from capital controls, such as Canada and the US, or the complete freedom within regions such as the EU, with its "Four Freedoms" and the Eurozone. During the First Age of Globalization that was brought to an end by World War I, there were very few restrictions on the movement of capital, but all major economies except for the United Kingdom and the Netherlands heavily restricted payments for goods by the use of current account controls such as tariffs and duties.

There is no consensus on whether capital control restrictions on the free movement of capital and payments across national borders benefits developing countries. Many economists agree that lifting capital controls while inflationary pressures persist, the country is in debt, and foreign currency reserves are low, will not be beneficial. When capital controls were lifted under these conditions in Argentina, the peso lost 30 percent of its value relative to the dollar. Most countries will lift capital controls during boom periods.

According to a 2016 study, the implementation of capital controls can be beneficial in a two-country situation for the country that implements the capital controls. The effects of capital controls are more ambiguous when both countries implement capital controls.

=== Arguments in favour of free capital movement ===
Pro-free market economists claim the following advantages for free movement of capital:

- It enhances overall economic growth by allowing savings to be channelled to their most productive use.
- By encouraging foreign direct investment, it helps developing economies to benefit from foreign expertise.
- Allows states to raise funds from external markets to help them mitigate a temporary recession.
- Enables both savers and borrowers to secure the best available market rate.
- When controls include taxes, funds raised are sometimes siphoned off by corrupt government officials for their personal use.
- Hawala-type traders across Asia have always been able to evade currency movement controls
- Computer and communications technologies have made unimpeded electronic funds transfer a convenience for increasing numbers of bank customers.

=== Arguments in favour of capital controls ===
Pro-capital control economists have made the following points.

- Capital controls may represent an optimal macroprudential policy that reduces the risk of financial crises and prevents the associated externalities.
- Global economic growth was on average considerably higher in the Bretton Woods periods where capital controls were widely in use. Using regression analysis, economists such as Dani Rodrik have found no positive correlation between growth and free capital movement.
- Capital controls limiting a nation's residents from owning foreign assets can ensure that domestic credit is available more cheaply than would otherwise be the case. This sort of capital control is still in effect in both India and China. In India the controls encourage residents to provide cheap funds directly to the government, while in China it means that Chinese businesses have an inexpensive source of loans.
- Economic crises have been considerably more frequent since the Bretton Woods capital controls were relaxed. Even economic historians who class capital controls as repressive have concluded that capital controls, more than the period's high growth, were responsible for the infrequency of crisis. Large uncontrolled capital inflows have frequently damaged a nation's economic development by causing its currency to appreciate, by contributing to inflation, and by causing unsustainable economic booms which often precede financial crises, which are in turn caused when the inflows sharply reverse and both domestic and foreign capital flee the country. The risk of crisis is especially high in developing economies where the inbound flows become loans denominated in foreign currency, so that the repayments become considerably more expensive as the developing country's currency depreciates. This is known as original sin.

== See also ==
- Prudential capital controls
- Price control
- Bretton Woods System
- Embedded liberalism
- Impossible trinity
- Mundell–Fleming model
- Financial repression
- Macroprudential policy
