= Ronald McKinnon =

Ronald McKinnon may refer to:

- Ronald McKinnon (American football), American football linebacker
- Ronald McKinnon (economist), applied economist
- Ronnie McKinnon Scottish footballer
- Ron McKinnon, Canadian politician

== See also ==
- Ronald McKinnon Wood, member of London County Council
