= Capital account convertibility =

Capital account convertibility is a feature of a nation's financial regime that centers on the ability to conduct transactions of local financial assets into foreign financial assets freely or at market determined exchange rates. It is sometimes referred to as capital asset liberation or CAC.

CAC is mostly a guideline to changes of ownership in foreign or domestic financial assets and liabilities. Tangentially, it covers and extends the framework of the creation and liquidation of claims on, or by the rest of the world, on local asset and currency markets.

== History ==
CAC was first coined as a theory by the Reserve Bank of India in 1997 by the Tarapore Committee, in an effort to find fiscal and economic policies that would enable developing Third World countries transition to globalized market economies. However, it had been practiced, although without formal thought or organization of policy or restriction, since the very early 1990s. Article VIII of the IMF’s Articles of Agreement is agreed by most economists to have been the basis for CAC, although it notably failed to anticipate problems with the concept in regard to outflows of currency.

However, before the formalization of CAC, there were problems with the theory. Free flow of assets was required to work in both directions. Although CAC freely enabled investment in the country, it also enabled quick liquidation and removal of capital assets from the country, both domestic and foreign. It also exposed domestic creditors to overseas credit risks, fluctuations in fiscal policy, and manipulation.

As a result, there were severe disruptions that helped to contribute to the East Asian crisis of the mid 1990s. In Malaysia, for example, there were heavy losses in overseas investments of at least one bank, in the magnitude of hundreds of millions of dollars. These were not realized and identified until a reform system strengthened regulatory and accounting controls. This led to the Tarapore Committee meeting which formalized CAC as utilizing a mixture of free asset allocation and stringent controls.

== Tenets ==
CAC has 5 basic statements designed as points of action:

- All types of liquid assets must be able to be exchanged freely, between any two nations in the world, with standardized exchange rates.
- The amounts must be a significant amount (in excess of $500,000).
- Capital inflows should be invested in semi-liquid assets, to prevent churning and excessive outflow.
- Institutional investors should not use CAC to manipulate fiscal policy or exchange rates.
- Excessive inflows and outflows should be buffered by national banks to provide collateral.

== Application ==
In most traditional theories of international trade, the reasoning for capital account convertibility was so that foreign investors could invest without barriers. Prior to its implementation, foreign investment was hindered by uneven exchange rates due to corrupt officials, local businessmen had no convenient way to handle large cash transactions, and national banks were disassociated from fiscal exchange policy and incurred high costs in supplying hard-currency loans for those few local companies that wished to do business abroad.

Due to the low exchange rates and lower costs associated with Third World nations, this was expected to spur domestic capital, which would lead to welfare gains, and in turn lead to higher GDP growth. The tradeoff for such growth was seen as a lack of sustainable internal GNP growth and a decrease in domestic capital investments.

When CAC is used with the proper restraints, this is exactly what happens. The entire outsourcing movement with jobs and factories going overseas is a direct result of the foreign investment aspect of CAC. The Tarapore Committee's recommendation of tying liquid assets to static assets (i.e., investing in long term government bonds, etc.) was seen by many economists as directly responsible for stabilizing the idea of capital account liberalization.

== Controversy ==
Despite changes in wording over the years, and additional safeguards, there is still criticism of CAC by some economists. American economists, in particular, find the restriction on inflows to Third World countries being invested in improvements as negative, since they would rather see such transactions put to direct use in growing capital.

== See also ==
- Capital controls
- Domestic liability dollarization
- Floating exchange rate
- Managed float regime
