= Stealth tax =

New tax that is collected in a way that is not obvious

A stealth tax is a tax levied in a way that is largely unnoticed, or not recognized as a traditional tax. The phrase was generally used in the United Kingdom by Conservatives against the New Labour government's behaviour and has been used in British politics since the 1990s.

== Origins ==
On 16 September 1996, the National Association of Pension Funds (NAPF) demanded a reverse to a tax on UK pension funds' dividends. Anne Robinson, the director general of the NAPF said pension funds are being "taxed by stealth".

The exact phrasing "stealth tax" has been in British political use since 1998 when it was used to refer to tax increases that apparently circumvented the 1997 New Labour manifesto commitment that "over the five years of a Labour government ... there will be no increase in the basic or top rates of income tax".

Anne Segall of The Daily Telegraph claimed on 17 January, 1998, that "taxes will rise by £7 billion this year ... as a result of a variety of measures introduced or extended by the chancellor Gordon Brown. Mr Brown's 'stealth' taxes are directed mainly at middle-class voters and in particular at middle-class professionals and those with savings".

On October 19, 1998 Francis Maude, then Shadow Chancellor (the opposition finance minister) claimed the Chancellor Gordon Brown was imposing "stealth taxes ... designed to conceal their effect".

Former Prime Minister Tony Blair only made occasional references to stealth taxes, such as on 1 November 2001 in relation to Company Car taxation, 9 November 2000 in relation to Fuel prices, and on 21 October 2002 in reference to Pensions.

On 22 May 2001, the expression increasing taxes by stealth was extensively used by former Prime Minister Margaret Thatcher on her address to the Conservative Party's rally in Plymouth.

== Examples ==
One form of stealth taxation occurs when deductions or exemptions are reduced based on income level resulting in more taxable income, but the same tax rate for a higher total tax. Under 2007 US tax law 1040 Schedule A itemized deductions and the $3,400 personal exemption are phased out (reduced) at higher income levels ($234,600 for married filers).

Stealth taxes might be recognized as taxation but remain largely unnoticed, as with Value Added Tax (VAT) in the UK between 1979 and 1991, during which period it rose from 8% to 15% (compensating for a large reduction in the higher and basic rates of income tax) and then to 17.5% (when the Poll Tax was replaced by a council tax), shifting the burden of taxation away from income onto consumption.

== Taxation policy ==
=== Regressive stealth taxation ===
Stealth taxes can be viewed as regressive, as more affluent people are less affected by VAT, for example. State lotteries may also be viewed as a form of taxation, and there is evidence that they are played more by poor people than by the affluent.

In January 1999 Conservative culture spokesman Peter Ainsworth described the National Lottery's New Opportunities fund as a "stealth tax". and Conservative leader William Hague claimed "The Labour stealth tax amounts to £1,500 for every working person". In Parliament on 3 November 1999 William Hague accused the government of levying a £500 million 'stealth tax' that would hit IT companies.

== See also ==
- Hidden tax
