= Political trilemma of the world economy =

Political responses to globalisation

The political trilemma of the world economy is a concept created by economist Dani Rodrik to capture the trade-offs that governments faced in their responses to globalization. The trilemma holds that "democracy, national sovereignty and global economic integration are mutually incompatible: we can combine any two of the three, but never have all three simultaneously and in full." According to Rodrik, in the late 20th century, states embraced globalization and national autonomy, and sacrificed democratic decision-making, while in the post-World War II period, states embraced democracy at home and national autonomy, and sacrificed globalization. The trilemma suggests that the backlash against globalization in the last few decades is rooted in a desire to reclaim democracy and national autonomy, even if it undermines economic integration. Rodrik first presented the trilemma in a 2000 paper.

According to The Economist, one rebuttal to the trilemma is found in Albert Hirschman's writings. Hirschman observed that diversification of trade (global economic integration) could bolster national sovereignty by making it harder for a state to be coerced by any other single state.

== See also ==
- Impossible trinity
- International political economy
