= Hidden tax =

Tax that is not visible to the taxpayer

A hidden tax is a tax that is not visible to the taxpayer. These taxes can raise prices of goods and lower salaries for workers. Hidden taxes, although hidden, can decrease the purchasing power of individuals significantly.

Many kinds of tax behave like hidden taxes:

Corporate income tax
Because of this tax, shareholders and employees get less dividends and salary. Also the tax is hidden in the cost of goods and services and, therefore, paid by the consumer.
Tariffs or import taxes
Fees that lower competition from foreign parties by raising the price of imports and products produced outside.
Sin tax
Taxes on alcohol and cigarettes are highly regressive.
Departure tax
A fee charged (under various names) by a country when a person is leaving that country.
Utilities taxes
According to a 1998 study, taxes take up 48% of the price of gasoline.
Inflation tax
It is a hidden regressive tax.
Financial repression
A range of measures which governments can employ to reduce their debt, which are often accompanied by inflation.
Profits from government-owned corporations
Especially when a government-owned corporation enjoys a legally protected monopoly and records excessive profits, such profits may be criticized as hidden taxation. Governments in some jurisdictions directly own utilities (making such profits related to utility taxes) and some monopolize the alcohol trade (making such profits related to sin taxes).
Sales taxes such as turnover taxes

== United States ==
A study by the Institute for Policy Innovation suggested that hidden taxes account $2,462 per capita.

=== Hidden tax ===
Quintiles of Household Cash Money Income according to the Tax Foundation, Calendar Year 2004

	Bottom 20 Percent	Second 20 Percent	Third 20 Percent	Fourth 20 Percent	Top 20 Percent
Total Federal Taxes	38.9%	55.7%	61.5%	64.4%	70.2%
Income	4.0%	12.0%	17.6%	22.6%	35.7%
Payroll	21.2%	30.6%	32.0%	30.4%	22.5%
Corporate Income	6.3%	8.4%	8.2%	8.2%	8.1%
Gas	1.6%	1.2%	1.0%	0.8%	0.6%
Alcoholic Beverages	0.8%	0.4%	0.4%	0.3%	0.2%
Tobacco	1.2%	0.6%	0.3%	0.2%	0.1%
Diesel Fuel	0.2%	0.3%	0.3%	0.3%	0.3%
Air Transport	0.5%	0.4%	0.4%	0.4%	0.4%
Other Excise	1.0%	0.6%	0.4%	0.4%	0.2%
Customs, Duties, etc.	2.2%	1.2%	0.9%	0.8%	0.5%
Estate & Gift	0.0%	0.0%	0.0%	0.0%	1.7%

.
