= William R. Cline =

American economist

- William Richard Cline
- Born: 1941 (age 84–85)

Academic background
- Education: Princeton University (BA); Yale University (PhD)

Academic work
- Discipline: International economics, environmental economics, climate change economics
- Institutions: Peterson Institute for International Economics, Brookings Institution
- Notable works: The Economics of Global Warming

William Richard Cline (born 1941) is an American economist and a Senior Fellow at the Peterson Institute for International Economics.

He graduated from Princeton University in 1963 and received a PhD in 1969 from Yale, and was deputy director of development and trade research at the office of the assistant secretary for international affairs at the United States Department of the Treasury from 1971 to 1973. He worked at the Brookings Institution from 1973 to 1981. He has been a senior fellow at the Peterson Institute for International Economics since 1981, with a joint appointment at the Center for Global Development. He was deputy managing director and chief economist of the Institute of International Finance from 1996 to 2001.

He has written, edited and published a large number of papers. His research topics include capital flows, Debt Relief, the Environment, Finance, International Financial Institutions, Trade and Development, and the economics of global warming and Climate change and agriculture. His book "The Economics of Global Warming" was honored with the Harold and Margaret Sprout Award.

== Selected works ==
- The Economics of Global Warming (1992) by William R. Cline ISBN 0-88132-132-X
