= Pecuniary externality =

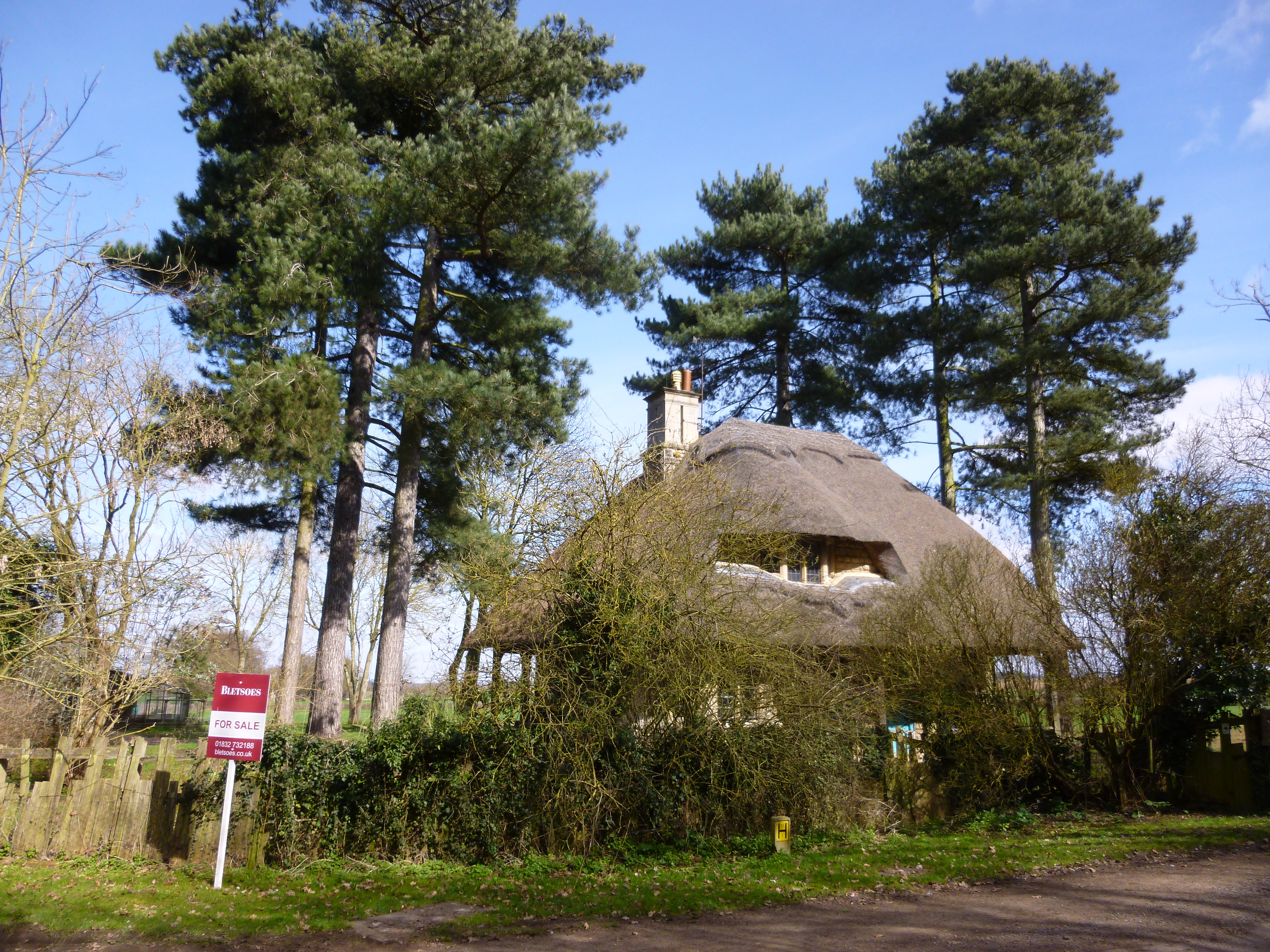
When city dwellers flock to rural areas and start to buy cottages as summer retreats, this can drive up house prices in these countryside regions, creating a pecuniary externality.

A pecuniary externality occurs when the actions of an economic agent cause an increase or decrease in market prices separate from the impact of those actions on the quantity of resources in the market. For example, an influx of city-dwellers buying second homes in a rural area can drive up house prices, making it difficult for young people in the area to buy a house. The externality operates through prices rather than through real resource effects.

This is in contrast with technological or real externalities that have a direct resource effect on a third party. For example, pollution from a factory directly harms the environment. As with real externalities, pecuniary externalities can be either positive (favorable, as when consumers face a lower price) or negative (unfavorable, as when they face a higher price). The distinction between pecuniary and technological externalities was originally introduced by Jacob Viner, who did not use the term externalities explicitly but distinguished between economies (positive externalities) and diseconomies (negative externalities) in 1932. Roland McKean distinguished between technological and pecuniary effects by name in 1958.

Under complete markets, pecuniary externalities offset each other. For example, if someone buys whiskey and this raises the price of whiskey, the other consumers of whiskey will be worse off and the producers of whiskey will be better off. However, the loss to consumers is precisely offset by the gain to producers; therefore the resulting equilibrium is still Pareto efficient. As a result, some economists have suggested that pecuniary externalities are not really externalities and should not be called such.

However, when markets are incomplete or constrained, then pecuniary externalities are relevant for Pareto efficiency. The reason is that under incomplete markets, the relative marginal utilities of agents are not equalized. Therefore, the welfare effects of a price movement on consumers and producers do not generally offset each other.

This inefficiency is particularly relevant in financial economics. When some agents are subject to financial constraints, then changes in their net worth or collateral that result from pecuniary externalities may have first order welfare implications. The free market equilibrium in such an environment is generally not considered Pareto efficient. This is an important welfare-theoretic justification for macroprudential regulation that may require the introduction of targeted policy tools.

== Positive and negative pecuniary externalities ==
Pecuniary externalities differ from traditional externalities in their influence on the allocation of resources within markets and do not necessarily lead to inefficiencies in resource allocation in the same way as traditional externalities do since they are, by definition, pure price effects. Instead, they mainly affect the distribution of wealth among market participants. Pecuniary externalities can be used to generate beneficial outcomes; however, since pecuniary externalities are Pareto efficient, they can also result in monopolies and other economic distortions.

Positive pecuniary externalities occur when changes in market prices result in beneficial outcomes for participants. Pecuniary externalities can be manipulated in order to redistribute wealth in a favorable way without resulting in a market failure. For instance, pecuniary externalities can motivate individuals or firms to adopt technologies or practices that have spillover benefits for others. Subsidies or tax incentives for renewable energy appliances, such as solar panels, can boost the household demand for these appliances. The decrease in electricity costs for others due to increased use of solar panels creates positive pecuniary externalities, making it beneficial for both individual adopters and society as a whole.

Negative pecuniary externalities occur when market price adjustments result in negative consequences for participants. For example, price increases caused by market dominance or monopolistic tendencies can result in a consumer surplus and disrupt the allocation of resources. Despite the potential for positive outcomes, negative pecuniary externalities can cause distortions and inefficiencies by forcing firms to exercise undue influence over markets.
