= Ronald McKinnon (economist) =

Applied economist and professor (1935-2014)

Ronald I. McKinnon
- Born: July 10, 1935; Edmonton, Alberta
- Died: 1 October 2014 (aged 79); Mills-Peninsula Hospital, Burlingame, California, United States
- Education: University of Alberta (B.Sc in 1956); University of Minnesota (Ph.D. in 1961)
- Known for: Developed the theory of financial repression
- Scientific career
- Fields: International economics, economic development
- Workplaces: Stanford University
- Doctoral advisor: Oswald Brownlee
- Doctoral students: James Brander; Arthur Laffer; Wallace Oates

Ronald Ian McKinnon (10 July 1935 – 1 October 2014) was an applied economist. His primary interests were international economics and economic development, with strong secondary interests in transitional economies and fiscal federalism. Understanding financial institutions in general, and monetary institutions in particular, was central to his teaching and research, with interests ranging from the proper regulation of banks and financial markets in poorer countries to the historical evolution of global and regional monetary systems in the context of the world dollar standard.

He had been a professor of economics at the Stanford University since 1961. In particular, he researched international trade and finance, economic development, monetary theory and policy; money and banking.

McKinnon is best known for developing the theory of "Financial repression" in 1973, working alongside his colleague Edward Shaw.

== Publications (incomplete) ==
- Ronald McKinnon (May 2014). China’s Currency Conundrum. SIEPR Policy Brief.
- Ronald McKinnon (Apr 2014). The Unloved World Dollar Standard: Greenspan-Bernanke *Bubbles in the Global Economy. SCID. SCID Working Paper 497.
- Ronald McKinnon and Gunther Schnabl (Feb 2014). China’s Exchange Rate and Financial Repression: The Conflicted Emergence of the Renminbi as an International Currency. SCID. SCID Working Paper 493.
- Ronald McKinnon (Oct 2013). Tapering Without Tears. SIEPR Policy Brief.

== Books ==
- Money and Capital in Economic Development. Brookings, 1973.
- Money in International Exchange: The Convertible-Currency System. Oxford Univ. Press, 1979.
- An International Standard for Monetary Stabilization. Institute for International Economics, 1984.
- The Order of Economic Liberalization: Financial Control in the Transition to a Market Economy. Johns Hopkins University Press, 1991; second edition, 1993, (Romanian, Chinese, and Arabic translations, 1997)
- The Rules of the Game: International Money and Exchange Rates. MIT Press, 1996.
- Dollar and Yen: Resolving Economic Conflict Between the United States and Japan (with Kenichi Ohno). MIT University Press, 1997, (Japanese translation, 1998; Chinese, 1999.)
- Exchange Rates under the East Asian Dollar Standard: Living with Conflicted Virtue. MIT Press 2005. (Chinese Translation, CFPH 2006.)
- The Unloved Dollar Standard: From Bretton Woods to the Rise of China. Oxford University Press, 2013
