= Dani Rodrik =

Turkish economist

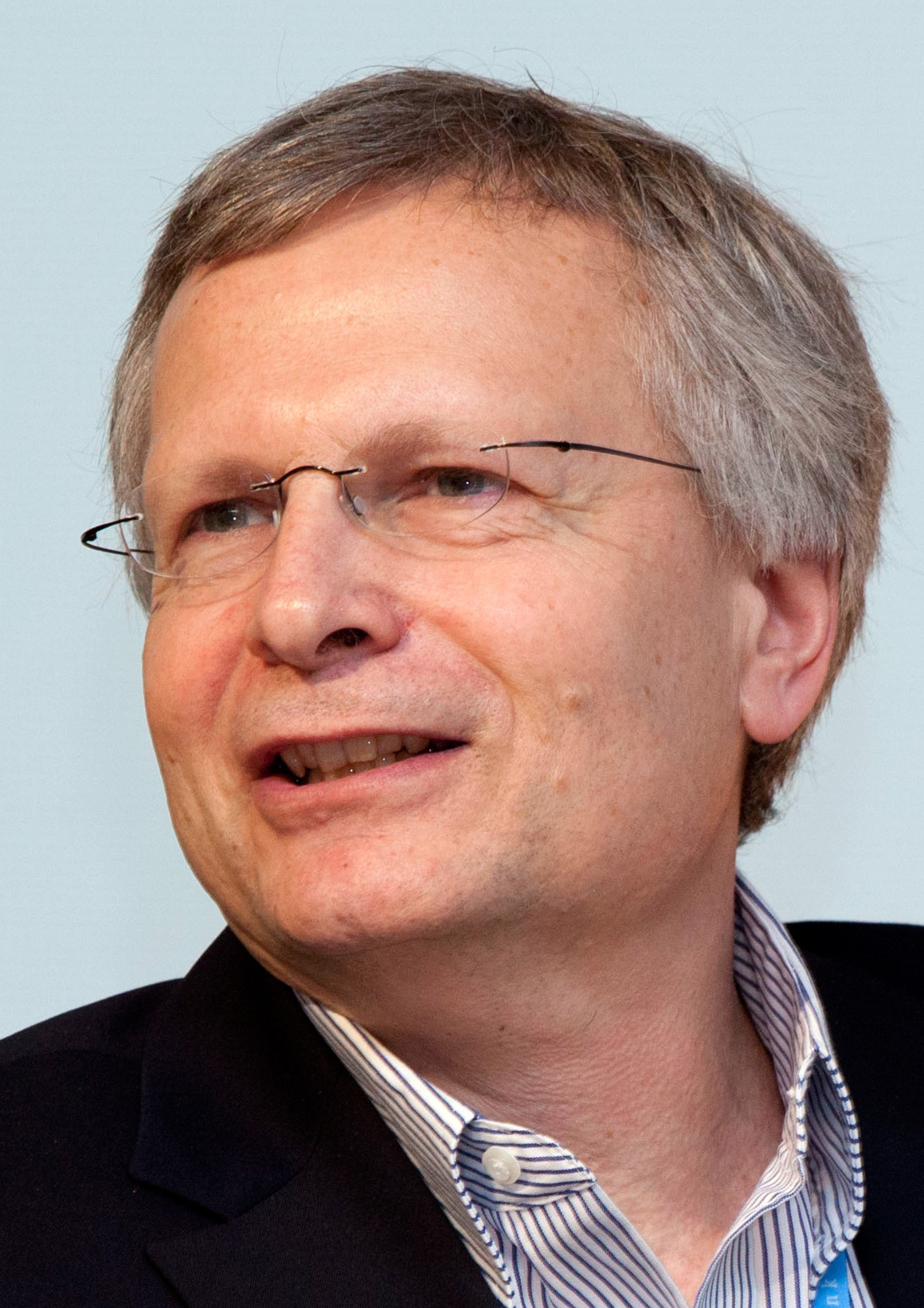
- Rodrik (2012)
- Born: August 14, 1957 (age 69); Istanbul, Turkey
- Citizenship: Turkish

Academic background
- Education: Robert College; Princeton University (PhD, MPA); Harvard University (AB)
- Doctoral advisor: Avinash Dixit

Academic work
- Discipline: International economics, economic development, political economy
- Institutions: Institute for Advanced Study
- Awards: Leontief Prize for Advancing the Frontiers of Economic Thought (2002)
- Website: Information at IDEAS / RePEc

Dani Rodrik (born August 14, 1957) is a Turkish economist and Ford Foundation Professor of International Political Economy at the John F. Kennedy School of Government at Harvard University. He was formerly the Albert O. Hirschman Professor of the Social Sciences at the Institute for Advanced Study in Princeton, New Jersey. He has published widely in the areas of international economics, economic development, and political economy. The question of what constitutes good economic policy and why some governments are more successful than others at adopting it is at the center of his research. His works include Economics Rules: The Rights and Wrongs of the Dismal Science and The Globalization Paradox: Democracy and the Future of the World Economy.

== Biography ==
Rodrik is descended from a family of Sephardic Jews.

After graduating from Robert College in Istanbul, he obtained an A.B. degree (summa cum laude) in Government and Economics from Harvard College in 1979. He then earned an M.P.A. degree (with distinction) from Princeton School of Public and International Affairs in 1981 and a Ph.D. degree in Economics from Princeton University in 1985, with the thesis titled Studies on the Welfare Theory of Trade and Exchange-rate Policy.

He had also been writing for the now defunct Turkish daily Radikal 2009–2016.

He joined the newly created World Economics Association as a member of the executive committee in 2011.

He is married to Pınar Doğan, a lecturer in Public Policy at the Harvard Kennedy School. She is the daughter of Turkish retired General Çetin Doğan.

As a scholar, he is affiliated with the National Bureau of Economic Research, Centre for Economic Policy Research (London), Center for Global Development, Institute for International Economics, and the Council on Foreign Relations, and is co-editor of the Review of Economics and Statistics. He has been the recipient of research grants from the Carnegie Corporation, Ford Foundation, and Rockefeller Foundation. Among other honors, he was presented the Leontief Prize for Advancing the Frontiers of Economic Thought in 2002 from the Global Development and Environment Institute.

On 8 November 2019, he received an honorary doctorate from Erasmus University Rotterdam.

On 21 January 2020, Pope Francis named him a member of the Pontifical Academy of Social Sciences.

== Work ==
His 1997 book Has Globalization Gone Too Far? was called "one of the most important economics books of the decade" in Bloomberg Businessweek.

In his article, he focused on three tensions between the global market and social stability. Pointing out that the so-called "globalization" has a dilemma of promoting international equality while exposing fault lines between the nation states with the skills and capitals to succeed in global markets and those without that advantage, he sees the free market system as a threat to social stability and deeply domestic norms. In 2000, Rodrick coined the political trilemma of the world economy.

Dani Rodrik is a regular contributor to Project Syndicate since 1998. He also founded Economics for Inclusive Prosperity (EfIP) with Suresh Naidu, Gabriel Zucman, and 11 additional founding members in February 2019.

== Selected publications ==
- Rodrik, Dani (2025). Shared Prosperity in a Fractured World: A New Economics for the Middle Class, the Global Poor, and Our Climate. Princeton University Press. ISBN 978-0691268316. (will be released in November 2025)
- Rodrik, Dani (2017). Straight Talk on Trade: Ideas for a Sane Economy. Princeton University Press. ISBN 978-0691177847.
- Rodrik, Dani (2016). "Premature Deindustrialization". Journal of Economic Growth. 21: 1–33. doi:10.1007/s10887-015-9122-3.
- Rodrik, Dani (2015). Economics Rules: The Rights and Wrongs of the Dismal Science. Norton & Company, Inc. ISBN 978-0-393-24641-4.
- Rodrik, Dani (2013). "Unconditional Convergence in Manufacturing". The Quarterly Journal of Economics. 128: 165–204. doi:10.1093/qje/qjs047.
- Rodrik, Dani (2011). The Globalization Paradox. Norton & Company, Inc. ISBN 978-0-393-07161-0.
- Rodrik, Dani (2007). One Economics, Many Recipes. Princeton University Press. ISBN 978-0-691-12951-8.
- McMillan, Margaret; Horn, Karen; Rodrik, Dani (2004). "When Economic Reform Goes Wrong: Cashews in Mozambique". Brookings Trade Forum 2003: 97–165.
- Rodrik, Dani, ed. (2003). In Search of Prosperity: Analytic Narratives on Economic Growth. Princeton University Press. ISBN 978-0-691-09268-3.
- Rodrik, Dani (2001). "The Global Governance of Trade As If Development Really Mattered" (PDF). UNDP. Archived from the original (PDF) on 2019-12-26.
- Rodrik, Dani (1999). The New Global Economy and Developing Countries: Making Openness Work. Overseas Development Council. ISBN 978-1-56517-027-8.
- Rodrik, Dani (1997). Has Globalization Gone Too Far?. Institute for International Economics. ISBN 978-0-88132-241-5.
