= Capital account =

Record of the net flow of investment into an economy

In macroeconomics and international finance, the capital account, also known as the capital and financial account, records the net flow of investment into an economy. It is one of the two primary components of the balance of payments, the other being the current account. Whereas the current account reflects a nation's net income, the capital account reflects net change in ownership of national assets.

A surplus in the capital account means money is flowing into the country, but unlike a surplus in the current account, the inbound flows effectively represent borrowings or sales of assets rather than payment for work. A deficit in the capital account means money is flowing out of the country, and it suggests the nation is increasing its ownership of foreign assets.

The term "capital account" is used with a narrower meaning by the International Monetary Fund (IMF) and affiliated sources. The IMF splits what the rest of the world calls the capital account into two top-level divisions: financial account and capital account, with by far the bulk of the transactions being recorded in its financial account.

== Definitions ==
At high level:
$$\text{Capital Account} = \left[ {\text{Change in foreign ownership} \atop \text{of domestic assets}} \right] - \left[ {\text{Change in domestic} \atop \text{ownership of foreign assets}} \right]$$

Breaking this down:
$$\text{Capital Account} = \left[ {\text{Foreign Direct} \atop \text{Investment}} \right] + \left[ {\text{Portfolio} \atop \text{Investment}} \right] + \left[ {\text{Other} \atop \text{Investment}} \right] + \left[ {\text{Reserve} \atop \text{Account}} \right]$$

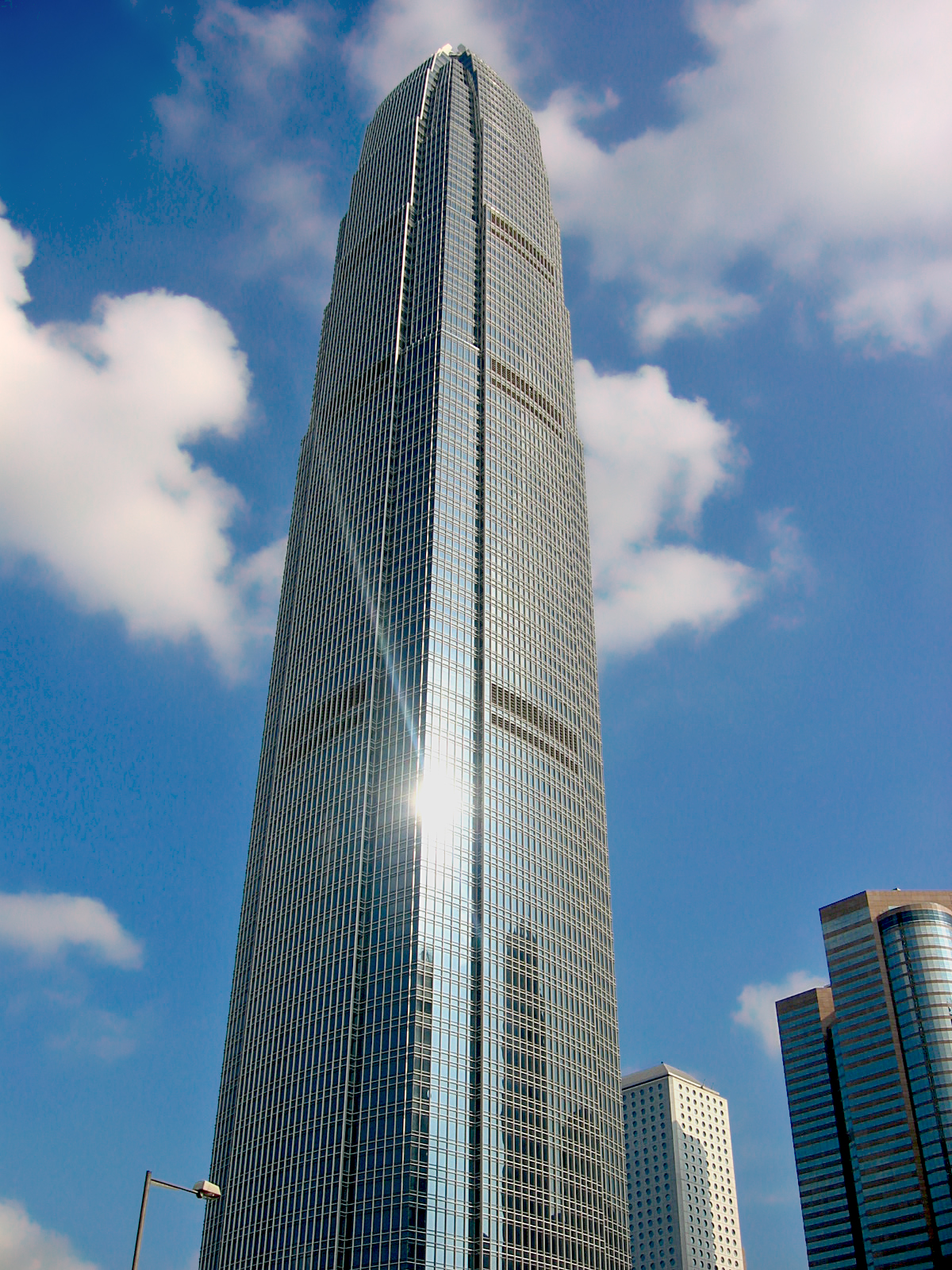
The International Finance Centre in Hong Kong, where many capital account transactions are processed.

- Foreign direct investment (FDI) refers to long-term capital investment, such as the purchase or construction of machinery, buildings, or whole manufacturing plants. If foreigners are investing in a country, that represents an inbound flow and counts as a surplus item on the capital account. If a nation's citizens are investing in foreign countries, that represents an outbound flow and counts as a deficit. After the initial investment, any yearly profits that are not reinvested will flow in the opposite direction but will be recorded in the current account rather than as capital.
- Portfolio investment refers to the purchase of shares and bonds. It is sometimes grouped together with "other" as short-term investment. As with FDI, the income derived from these assets is recorded in the current account; the capital account entry will just be for any buying or selling of the portfolio assets in the international capital markets.
- Other investment includes capital flows into bank accounts or provided as loans. Large short-term flows between accounts in different nations commonly occur when the market can take advantage of fluctuations in interest rates and/or the exchange rate between currencies. Sometimes this category can include the reserve account.
- Reserve account. The reserve account is operated by a nation's central bank to buy and sell foreign currencies; it can be a source of large capital flows to counteract those originating from the market. Inbound capital flows (from sales of the nation's foreign currency), especially when combined with a current account surplus, can cause a rise in value (appreciation) of a nation's currency, while outbound flows can cause a fall in value (depreciation). If a government (or, if authorized to operate independently in this area, the central bank itself) does not consider the market-driven change to its currency value to be in the nation's best interests, it can intervene.

=== Central bank operations and the reserve account ===
Conventionally, central banks have two principal tools to influence the value of their nation's currency: raising or lowering the base rate of interest and, more effectively, buying or selling their currency. Setting a higher interest rate than other major central banks will tend to attract funds via the nation's capital account, and this will act to raise the value of its currency. A relatively low interest rate will have the opposite effect. Since World War II, interest rates have largely been set with a view to the needs of the domestic economy, and moreover, changing the interest rate alone has only a limited effect.

A nation's ability to prevent a fall in the value of its own currency is limited mainly by the size of its foreign reserves: it needs to use the reserves to buy back its currency. Starting in 2013, a trend has developed for some central banks to attempt to exert upward pressure on their currencies by means of currency swaps rather than by directly selling their foreign reserves. In the absence of foreign reserves, central banks may affect international pricing indirectly by selling assets (usually government bonds) domestically, which, however, diminishes liquidity in the economy and may lead to deflation.

When a currency rises higher than monetary authorities might like (making exports less competitive internationally), it is usually considered relatively easy for an independent central bank to counter this. By buying foreign currency or foreign financial assets (usually other governments' bonds), the central bank has a ready means to lower the value of its own currency; if it needs to, it can always create more of its own currency to fund these purchases. The risk, however, is general price inflation. The term "printing money" is often used to describe such monetization, but is an anachronism, since most money exists in the form of deposits and its supply is manipulated through the purchase of bonds. A third mechanism that central banks and governments can use to raise or lower the value of their currency is simply to talk it up or down, by hinting at future action that may discourage speculators. Quantitative easing, a practice used by major central banks in 2009, consisted of large-scale bond purchases by central banks. The desire was to stabilize banking systems and, if possible, encourage investment to reduce unemployment.

As an example of direct intervention to manage currency valuation, in the 20th century Great Britain's central bank, the Bank of England, would sometimes use its reserves to buy large amounts of pound sterling to prevent it falling in value. Black Wednesday was a case where it had insufficient reserves of foreign currency to do this successfully. Conversely, in the early 21st century, several major emerging economies effectively sold large amounts of their currencies in order to prevent their value rising, and in the process built up large reserves of foreign currency, principally the US dollar.

Sometimes the reserve account is classified as "below the line" and thus not reported as part of the capital account. Flows to or from the reserve account can substantially affect the overall capital account. Taking the example of China in the early 21st century, and excluding the activity of its central bank, China's capital account had a large surplus, as it had been the recipient of much foreign investment. If the reserve account is included, however, China's capital account has been in large deficit, as its central bank purchased large amounts of foreign assets (chiefly US government bonds) to a degree sufficient to offset not just the rest of the capital account, but its large current account surplus as well.

==== Sterilization ====
In the financial literature, sterilization is a term commonly used to refer to operations of a central bank that mitigate the potentially undesirable effects of inbound capital: currency appreciation and inflation. Depending on the source, sterilization can mean the relatively straightforward recycling of inbound capital to prevent currency appreciation and/or a range of measures to check the inflationary impact of inbound capital. The classic way to sterilize the inflationary effect of the extra money flowing into the domestic base from the capital account is for the central bank to use open market operations where it sells bonds domestically, thereby soaking up new cash that would otherwise circulate around the home economy. A central bank normally makes a small loss from its overall sterilization operations, as the interest it earns from buying foreign assets to prevent appreciation is usually less than what it has to pay out on the bonds it issues domestically to check inflation. In some cases, however, a profit can be made. In the strict textbook definition, sterilization refers only to measures aimed at keeping the domestic monetary base stable; an intervention to prevent currency appreciation that involved merely buying foreign assets without counteracting the resulting increase of the domestic money supply would not count as sterilization. A textbook sterilization would be, for example, the Federal Reserve's purchase of $1 billion in foreign assets. This would create additional liquidity in foreign hands. At the same time, the Fed would sell $1 billion of debt securities into the US market, draining the domestic economy of $1 billion. With $1 billion added abroad and $1 billion removed from the domestic economy, the net capital inflow that would have influenced the currency's exchange rate has undergone sterilization.

=== International Monetary Fund ===
The above definition is the one most widely used in economic literature, in the financial press, by corporate and government analysts (except when they are reporting to the IMF), and by the World Bank. In contrast, what the rest of the world calls the capital account is labelled the "financial account" by the International Monetary Fund (IMF) and the United Nations System of National Accounts (SNA). In the IMF's definition, the capital account represents a small subset of what the standard definition designates the capital account, largely comprising transfers. Transfers are one-way flows, such as gifts, as opposed to commercial exchanges (i.e., buying/selling and barter). The largest type of transfer between nations is typically foreign aid, but that is mostly recorded in the current account. An exception is debt forgiveness, which in a sense is the transfer of ownership of an asset. When a country receives significant debt forgiveness, that will typically comprise the bulk of its overall IMF capital account entry for that year.

The IMF's capital account does include some non-transfer flows, which are sales involving non-financial and non-produced assets—for example, natural resources like land, leases and licenses, and marketing assets such as brands—but the sums involved are typically very small, as most movement in these items occurs when both seller and buyer are of the same nationality.

Transfers apart from debt forgiveness recorded in the IMF's capital account include the transfer of goods and financial assets by migrants leaving or entering a country, the transfer of ownership on fixed assets, the transfer of funds received to the sale or acquisition of fixed assets, gift and inheritance taxes, death levies, and uninsured damage to fixed assets. In a non-IMF representation, these items might be grouped in the "other" subtotal of the capital account. They typically amount to a very small amount in comparison to loans and flows into and out of short-term bank accounts.

== Capital controls ==
Capital controls are measures imposed by a state's government aimed at managing capital account transactions. They include outright prohibitions against some or all capital account transactions, transaction taxes on the international sale of specific financial assets, or caps on the size of international sales and purchases of specific financial assets. While usually aimed at the financial sector, controls can affect ordinary citizens, for example in the 1960s British families were at one point restricted from taking more than £50 with them out of the country for their foreign holidays. Countries without capital controls that limit the buying and selling of their currency at market rates are said to have full capital account convertibility.

Following the Bretton Woods agreement established at the close of World War II, most nations put in place capital controls to prevent large flows either into or out of their capital account. John Maynard Keynes, one of the architects of the Bretton Woods system, considered capital controls to be a permanent part of the global economy. Both advanced and emerging nations adopted controls; in basic theory, it may be supposed that large inbound investments will speed an emerging economy's development, but empirical evidence suggests this does not reliably occur, and in fact large capital inflows can hurt a nation's economic development by causing its currency to appreciate, by contributing to inflation, and by causing an unsustainable "bubble" of economic activity that often precedes financial crisis. The inflows sharply reverse once capital flight takes places after the crisis occurs. As part of the displacement of Keynesianism in favor of free market orientated policies, countries began abolishing their capital controls, starting between 1973 and 1974 with the US, Canada, Germany and Switzerland and followed by Great Britain in 1979. Most other advanced and emerging economies followed, chiefly in the 1980s and early 1990s.

An exception to this trend was Malaysia, which in 1998 imposed capital controls in the wake of the 1997 Asian financial crisis. While most Asian economies didn't impose controls, after the 1997 crises they ceased to be net importers of capital and became net exporters instead. Large inbound flows were directed "uphill" from emerging economies to the US and other developed nations. According to economist C. Fred Bergsten the large inbound flow into the US was one of the causes of the 2008 financial crisis. By the second half of 2009, low interest rates and other aspects of the government led response to the global crises had resulted in increased movement of capital back towards emerging economies. In November 2009 the Financial Times reported several emerging economies such as Brazil and India had begun to implement or at least signal the possible adoption of capital controls to reduce the flow of foreign capital into their economies.

== See also ==
- Balance of payments
- Capital good
- Factors of production
- Net capital outflow
