= International monetary system =

Global arrangements on currency matters

An international monetary system is a set of internationally agreed rules, conventions and supporting institutions that facilitate international trade, cross border investment and generally the reallocation of capital between states that have different currencies. It should provide means of payment acceptable to buyers and sellers of different nationalities, including deferred payment. To operate successfully, it needs to inspire confidence, to provide sufficient liquidity for fluctuating levels of trade, and to provide means by which global imbalances can be corrected. The system can grow organically as the collective result of numerous individual agreements between international economic factors spread over several decades. Alternatively, it can arise from a single architectural vision, as happened at Bretton Woods in 1944.

== Historical overview ==
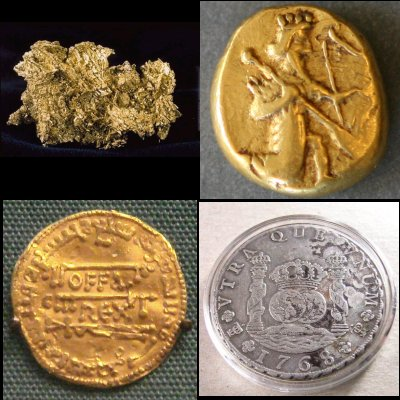
Historic international currencies. From top left: crystalline gold, a 5th-century BCE Persian daric, an 8th-century English mancus, and an 18th-century Spanish real.

Throughout history, precious metals such as gold and silver have been used for trade, sometimes in the form of bullion, and from early history the coins of various issuers – generally kingdoms and empires – have been traded. The earliest known records of pre-coinage use of precious metals for monetary exchange are from Mesopotamia and Egypt, dating from the third millennium BC. Early money took many forms, apart from bullion; for instance bronze spade money which became common in Zhou dynasty China in the late 7th century BC. At that time, forms of money were also developed in Lydia in Asia Minor, from where its use spread to nearby Greek cities and later to many other places.

Sometimes formal monetary systems have been imposed by regional rulers. For example, scholars have tentatively suggested that the Roman king Servius Tullius created a primitive monetary system in the early history of Rome. Tullius reigned in the sixth century BC – several centuries before Rome is believed to have developed a formal coinage system.

As with bullion, early use of coinage is believed to have been generally the preserve of the elite. But by about the 4th century BC coins were widely used in Greek cities. They were generally supported by the city state authorities, who endeavoured to ensure they retained their values regardless of fluctuations in the availability of whatever base or precious metals they were made from. From Greece the use of coins spread slowly westwards throughout Europe, and eastwards to India. Coins were in use in India from about 400 BC; initially they played a greater role in religion than in trade, but by the 2nd century they had become central to commercial transactions. Monetary systems that were developed in India were so successful that they spread through parts of Asia well into the Middle Ages.

As a variety of coins became common within a region, they were exchanged by moneychangers, the predecessors of today's foreign exchange market, as mentioned in the Biblical story of Jesus and the money changers. In Venice and the other Italian city states of the early Middle Ages, money changers would often have to struggle to perform calculations involving six or more currencies. This partly led to Fibonacci writing his Liber Abaci which popularised the use of Indo-Arabic numerals, which displaced the more difficult Roman numerals then in use by western merchants.

When a given nation or empire has achieved regional hegemony, its currency has been a basis for international trade, and hence for a de facto monetary system. In the West – Europe and the Middle East – an early such coin was the Persian daric. This was succeeded by Roman currency of the Roman Empire, such as the denarius, then the gold dinar of the Ottoman Empire, and later – from the 16th to 20th centuries, during the Age of Imperialism – by the currency of European colonial powers: the Spanish dollar, the Dutch guilder, the French franc and the British pound sterling; at times one currency has been pre-eminent, at times no one dominated. With the growth of American power, the US dollar became the basis for the international monetary system, formalised in the Bretton Woods agreement that established the post–World War II monetary order, with fixed exchange rates of other currencies to the dollar, and convertibility of the dollar into gold. The Bretton Woods system broke down, culminating in the Nixon shock of 1971, ending convertibility; but the US dollar has remained the de facto basis of the world monetary system, though no longer de jure, with various European currencies and the Japanese yen also being prominent in foreign exchange markets. Since the formation of the euro, the euro has also gained use as a reserve currency and a medium of transactions, though the dollar has remained the most important currency.

A dominant currency may be used directly or indirectly by other nations: for example, English kings minted the gold mancus, presumably to function as dinars to exchange with Islamic Spain; colonial powers sometimes minted coins that resembled those already used in a distant territory; and more recently, a number of nations have used the US dollar as their local currency, a custom called dollarization.

Until the 19th century, the global monetary system was loosely linked at best, with Europe, the Americas, India and China (among others) having largely separate economies, and hence monetary systems were regional. European colonization of the Americas, starting with the Spanish empire, led to the integration of American and European economies and monetary systems, and European colonization of Asia led to the dominance of European currencies, notably the British pound sterling in the 19th century, succeeded by the US dollar in the 20th century. Some, such as Michael Hudson, foresee the decline of a single base for the global monetary system, and the emergence instead of regional trade blocs; he cites the emergence of the euro as an example. See also global financial systems, world-systems approach and polarity in international relations. It was in the later half of the 19th century that a monetary system with close to universal global participation emerged, based on the gold standard.

== History of modern global monetary orders ==
According to J. Lawrence Broz and Jeffry A. Frieden, the sustainability of international monetary cooperation has tended to be affected by:

1. A shared interest in currency stability
2. Interlinkages to other important issues
3. The presence of institutions that formalize the international monetary cooperation
4. The number of actors involved, in particular whether one or a few powerful states are willing to take the lead in managing international monetary affairs
5. Macroeconomic conditions (during economic downturns, states are incentivized to defect from international monetary cooperation)

=== The pre-WWI financial order: 1816–1919 ===
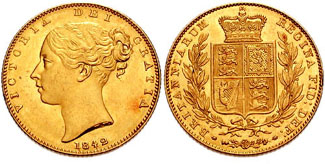
The British gold sovereign or £1 coin was the preeminent circulating gold coin during the classical gold standard period. of 1816 to 1914

From the 1816 to the outbreak of World War I in 1914, the world benefited from a well-integrated financial order, sometimes known as the "first age of globalisation". There were monetary unions which enabled member countries to accept each other's currencies as legal tender. Such unions included the Latin Monetary Union (Belgium, Italy, Switzerland, France) and the Scandinavian monetary union (Denmark, Norway and Sweden). In the absence of shared membership of a union, transactions were facilitated by widespread participation in the gold standard, by both independent nations and their colonies. Great Britain was at the time the world's pre-eminent financial, imperial, and industrial power, ruling more of the world and exporting more capital as a percentage of her national income than any other creditor nation has since.

While capital controls comparable to the Bretton Woods system were not in place, damaging capital flows were far less common than they were to be in the post 1971 era. In fact Great Britain's capital exports helped to correct global imbalances as they tended to be counter-cyclical, rising when Britain's economy went into recession, thus compensating other states for income lost from export of goods. Accordingly, this era saw mostly steady growth and a relatively low level of financial crises. In contrast to the Bretton Woods system, the pre–World War I financial order was not created at a single high level conference; rather it evolved organically in a series of discrete steps. The Gilded Age, a time of especially rapid development in North America, falls into this period.

=== Between the World Wars: 1919–1939 ===
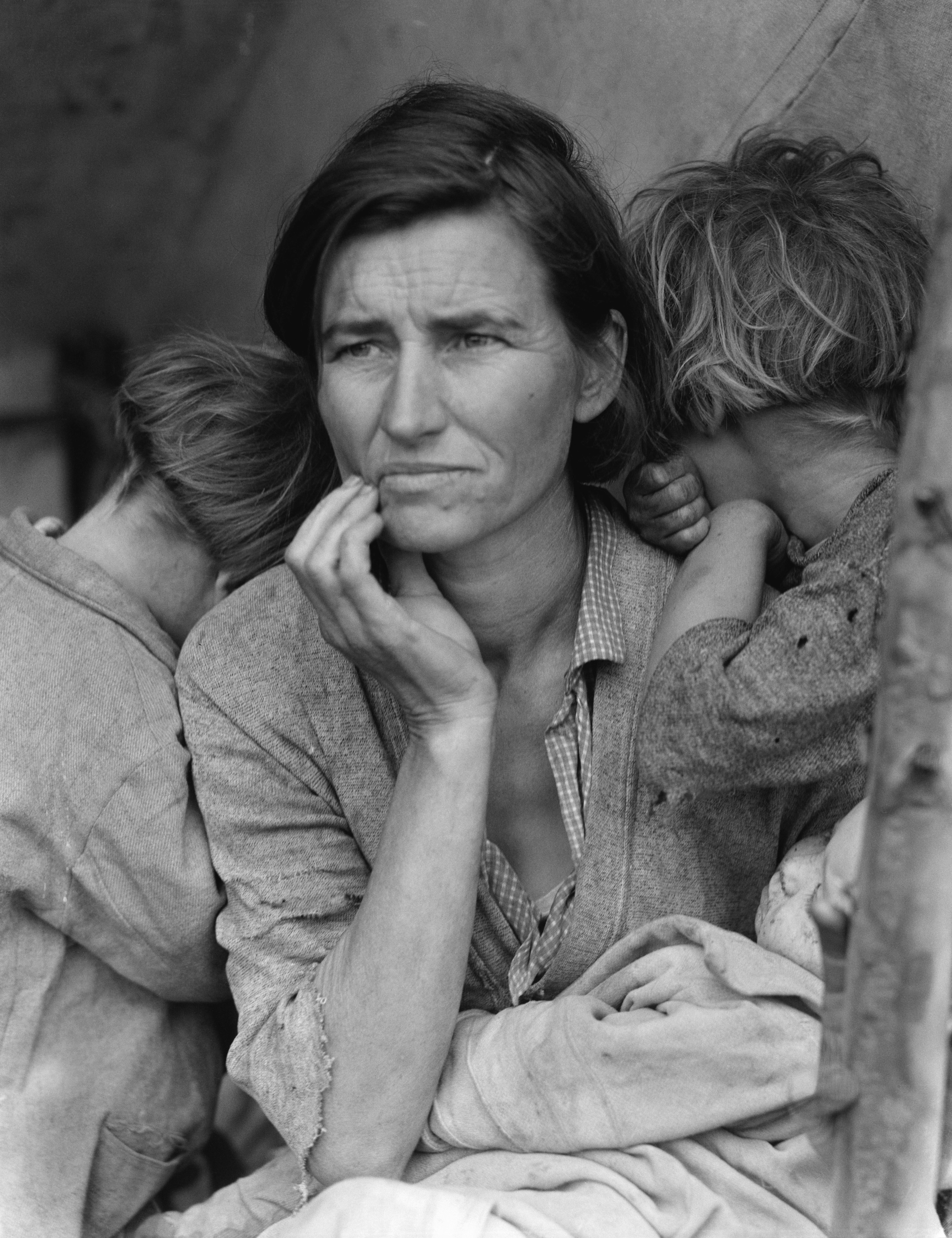
This era saw periods of worldwide economic hardship. The image is Dorothea Lange's Migrant Mother depiction of destitute pea-pickers in California, taken in March 1936.

The years between the world wars have been described as a period of "de-globalisation", as both international trade and capital flows shrank compared to the period before World War I. During World War I, countries had abandoned the gold standard. Except for the United States, they later returned to it only briefly. By the early 1930s, the prevailing order was essentially a fragmented system of floating exchange rates. In this era, the experience of Great Britain and others was that the gold standard ran counter to the need to retain domestic policy autonomy. To protect their reserves of gold, countries would sometimes need to raise interest rates and generally follow a deflationary policy. The greatest need for this could arise in a downturn, just when leaders would have preferred to lower rates to encourage growth. Economist Nicholas Davenport had even argued that the wish to return Britain to the gold standard "sprang from a sadistic desire by the Bankers to inflict pain on the British working class".

By the end of World War I, Great Britain was heavily indebted to the United States, allowing the US to largely displace it as the world's foremost financial power. The United States, however, was reluctant to assume Great Britain's leadership role, partly due to isolationist influences and a focus on domestic concerns. In contrast to Great Britain in the previous era, capital exports from the US were not countercyclical. They expanded rapidly with the United States' economic growth in the 1920s until 1928, but then almost completely halted as the US economy began slowing in that year. As the Great Depression intensified in 1930, financial institutions were hit hard along with trade; in 1930 alone, 1345 US banks collapsed. During the 1930s, the United States raised trade barriers, refused to act as an international lender of last resort, and refused calls to cancel war debts, all of which further aggravated economic hardship for other countries. According to economist John Maynard Keynes, another factor contributing to the turbulent economic performance of this era was the insistence of French premier Clemenceau that Germany pay war reparations at too high a level, which Keynes described in his book The Economic Consequences of the Peace.

=== The Bretton Woods Era: 1944–1973 ===
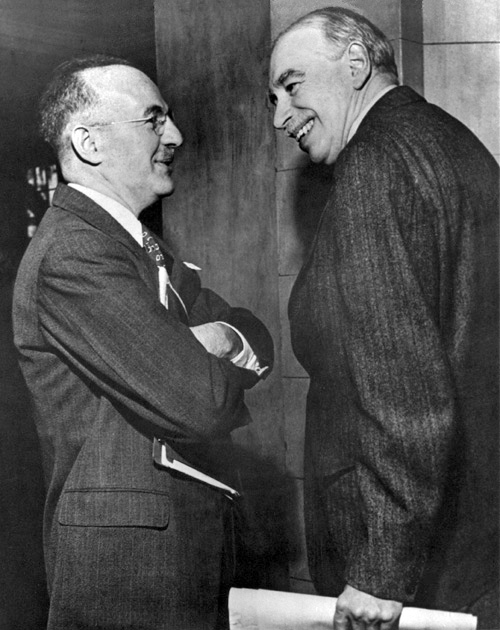
Harry Dexter White (left) and John Maynard Keynes (right) at Bretton Woods

British and American policy makers began to plan the post-war international monetary system in the early 1940s. The objective was to create an order that combined the benefits of an integrated and relatively liberal international system with the freedom for governments to pursue domestic policies aimed at promoting full employment and social wellbeing. The principal architects of the new system, John Maynard Keynes and Harry Dexter White, created a plan which was endorsed by the 42 countries attending the 1944 Bretton Woods conference, formally known as the United Nations Monetary and Financial Conference. The plan involved nations agreeing to a system of fixed but adjustable exchange rates so that the currencies were pegged against the dollar, with the dollar itself convertible into gold. So in effect this was a gold – dollar exchange standard. There were a number of improvements on the old gold standard. Two international institutions, the International Monetary Fund (IMF) and the World Bank were created. A key part of their function was to replace private finance as a more reliable source of lending for investment projects in developing states. At the time the soon to be defeated powers of Germany and Japan were envisaged as states soon to be in need of such development, and there was a desire from both the US and Britain not to see the defeated powers saddled with punitive sanctions that would inflict lasting pain on future generations. The new exchange rate system allowed countries facing economic hardship to devalue their currencies by up to 10% against the dollar (more if approved by the IMF) – thus they would not be forced to undergo deflation to stay in the gold standard. A system of capital controls was introduced to protect countries from the damaging effects of capital flight and to allow countries to pursue independent macro economic policies while still welcoming flows intended for productive investment. Keynes had argued against the dollar having such a central role in the monetary system, and suggested an international currency called bancor be used instead, but he was overruled by the Americans. Towards the end of the Bretton Woods era, the central role of the dollar became a problem as international demand eventually forced the US to run a persistent trade deficit, which undermined confidence in the dollar. This, together with the emergence of a parallel market for gold in which the price soared above the official US mandated price, led to speculators running down the US gold reserves. Even when convertibility was restricted to nations only, some, notably France, continued building up hoards of gold at the expense of the US. Eventually these pressures caused President Nixon to end all convertibility into gold on 15 August 1971. This event marked the effective end of the Bretton Woods system; attempts were made to find other mechanisms to preserve the fixed exchange rates over the next few years, but they were not successful, resulting in a system of floating exchange rates.

=== The post Bretton Woods system: 1973–present ===
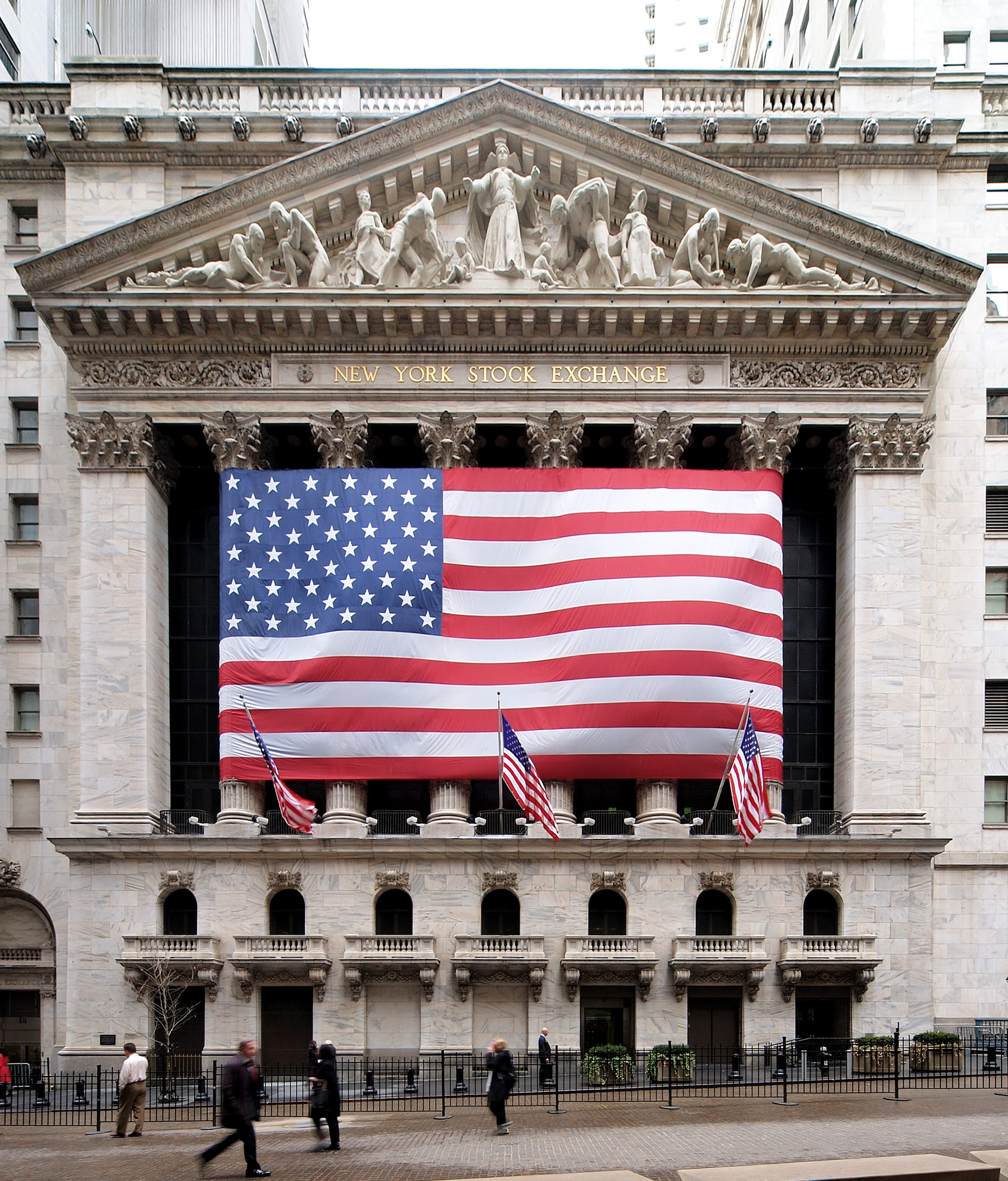
The New York Stock Exchange. The current era has seen huge and turbulent flows of capital between nations.

An alternative name for the post Bretton Woods system is the Washington Consensus. While the name was coined in 1989, the associated economic system came into effect years earlier: according to economic historian Lord Skidelsky the Washington Consensus is generally seen as spanning 1980–2009 (the latter half of the 1970s being a transitional period). The transition away from Bretton Woods was marked by a switch from a state led to a market led system. The Bretton Wood system is considered by economic historians to have broken down in the 1970s: crucial events being Nixon suspending the dollar's convertibility into gold in 1971, the United States' abandonment of capital controls in 1974, and the UK's ending of capital controls in 1979 which was swiftly copied by most other major economies.

In some parts of the developing world, liberalisation brought significant benefits for large sections of the population – most prominently with Deng Xiaoping's reform and opening up in China since 1978 and the liberalisation of India after its 1991 crisis.

Generally the industrial nations experienced much slower growth and higher unemployment than in the previous era, and according to economist Gordon Fletcher in retrospect the 1950s and 60s when the Bretton Woods system was operating came to be seen as a golden age. Financial crises have been more intense and have increased in frequency by about 300% – with the damaging effects prior to 2008 being chiefly felt in the emerging economies. On the positive side, at least until 2008 investors have frequently achieved very high rates of return, with salaries and bonuses in the financial sector reaching record levels.

== Calls for a "New Bretton Woods" ==
Competing ideas for the next international monetary system
System	Reserve assets	Leaders
Flexible exchange rates	Dollar, euro, renminbi	US, Eurozone, China
Special drawing rights standard	SDR	US, G-20, IMF
Gold standard	Gold, dollar	US
Delhi Declaration	Currency basket	BRICS

Leading financial journalist Martin Wolf has reported that all financial crises since 1971 have been preceded by large capital inflows into affected regions. While ever since the seventies there have been numerous calls from the global justice movement for a revamped international system to tackle the problem of unfettered capital flows, it was not until late 2008 that this idea began to receive substantial support from leading politicians. On September 26, 2008, French President Nicolas Sarkozy, then also the President of the European Union, said, "We must rethink the financial system from scratch, as at Bretton Woods."

On October 13, 2008, British Prime Minister Gordon Brown said world leaders must meet to agree to a new economic system:

We must have a new Bretton Woods, building a new international financial architecture for the years ahead.

However, Brown's approach was quite different from the original Bretton Woods system, emphasising the continuation of globalization and free trade as opposed to a return to fixed exchange rates.

There were tensions between Brown and Sarkozy, the latter of whom argued that the "Anglo-Saxon" model of unrestrained markets had failed. However European leaders were united in calling for a "Bretton Woods II" summit to redesign the world's financial architecture.

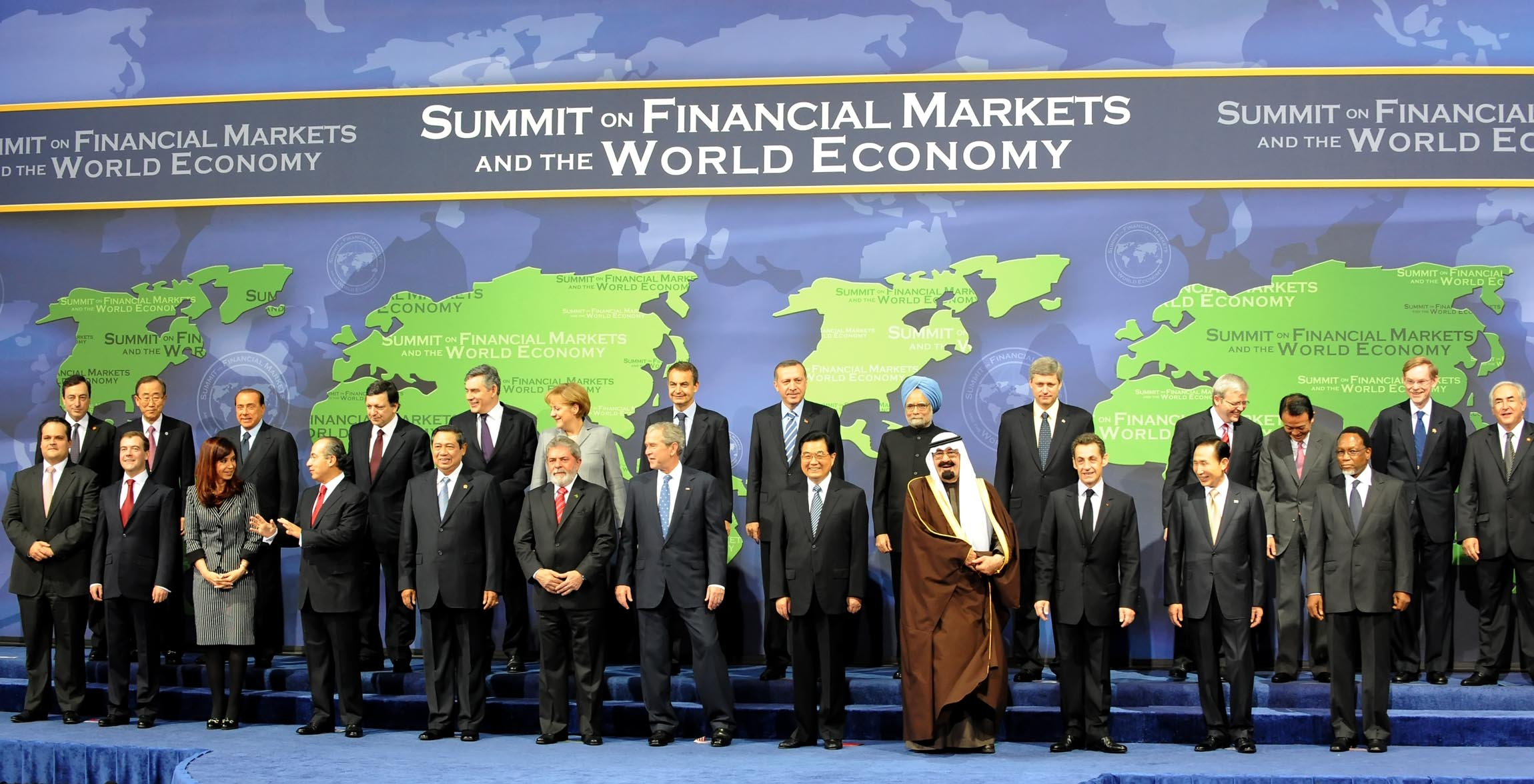
G-20 leaders at Summit on Financial Markets and the World Economy.

President Bush was agreeable to the calls, and the resulting meeting was the 2008 G-20 Washington summit. International agreement was achieved for the common adoption of Keynesian fiscal stimulus, an area where the US and China were to emerge as the world's leading actors. Yet there was no substantial progress towards reforming the international financial system, and nor was there at the 2009 meeting of the World Economic Forum at Davos.

Despite this lack of results leaders continued to campaign for Bretton Woods II. Italian Economics Minister Giulio Tremonti said that Italy would use its 2009 G7 chairmanship to push for a "New Bretton Woods". He had been critical of the U.S. response to the 2008 financial crisis, and had suggested that the dollar may be superseded as the base currency of the Bretton Woods system.

Choike, a portal organisation representing Southern Hemisphere NGOs, called for the establishment of "international permanent and binding mechanisms of control over capital flows" and as of March 2009 had achieved over 550 signatories from civil society organisations.

March 2009 saw Gordon Brown continuing to advocate for reform and the granting of extended powers to international financial institutions like the IMF at the April G20 summit in London, and was said to have president Obama's support . Also during March 2009, in a speech entitled Reform the International Monetary System, Zhou Xiaochuan, the governor of the People's Bank of China came out in favour of Keynes's idea of a centrally managed global reserve currency. Dr Zhou argued that it was unfortunate that part of the reason for the Bretton Woods system breaking down was the failure to adopt Keynes's bancor. Dr Zhou said that national currencies were unsuitable for use as global reserve currencies as a result of the Triffin dilemma – the difficulty faced by reserve currency issuers in trying to simultaneously achieve their domestic monetary policy goals and meet other countries' demand for reserve currency. Dr Zhou proposed a gradual move towards increased use of IMF special drawing rights (SDRs) as a centrally managed global reserve currency. His proposal attracted much international attention. In a November 2009 article published in Foreign Affairs magazine, economist C. Fred Bergsten argued that Dr Zhou's suggestion or a similar change to the international monetary system would be in the United States' best interests as well as the rest of the world's.

Leaders meeting in April at the 2009 G-20 London summit agreed to allow $250 Billion of SDRs to be created by the IMF, to be distributed to all IMF members according to each countries voting rights. In the aftermath of the summit, Gordon Brown declared "the Washington Consensus is over". However, in a book published during September 2009, Professor Robert Skidelsky, an international expert on Keynesianism, argued it was still too early to say whether a new international monetary system was emerging.

On Jan 27, in his opening address to the 2010 World Economic Forum in Davos, President Sarkozy repeated his call for a new Bretton Woods, and was met by wild applause by a sizeable proportion of the audience.

In December 2011, the Bank of England published a paper arguing for reform, saying that the current international monetary system has performed poorly compared to the Bretton Woods system.

In August 2012 in an International Herald Tribune op-ed, Harvard University professor and director of the Committee on Capital Markets Regulation Hal S. Scott called for a global response to the Euro-zone crisis. He wrote that two failures to address European problems around German power had led to world wars in the 20th century and that the current crisis was also beyond the capacity of Europe, with Germany again at the center, to solve on their own. Accepting that leadership transitions were underway in both China and America, Scott called on all concerned—with Japan included with China and America—to begin organizing a global restructuring through the International Monetary Fund with possibly a Bretton Woods II conference as part of the process. MarketWatch commentator Darrell Delamaide endorsed Scott's idea but concluded "unfortunately it's not likely to happen". He added first the example of the failure of Europe to address successfully the breakup of Yugoslavia without outside assistance as a reason for his endorsement. But he found U.S. presidential and Treasury Department leadership and IMF leadership dramatically lacking in the capacity to mount an initiative such as Scott proposed.

== See also ==
- Bretton Woods Project
- Eurodad
- Global financial system
- History of money
- International Monetary and Economic Conferences
