= Reserve currency =

Currencies held by monetary authorities as part of their foreign exchange reserves

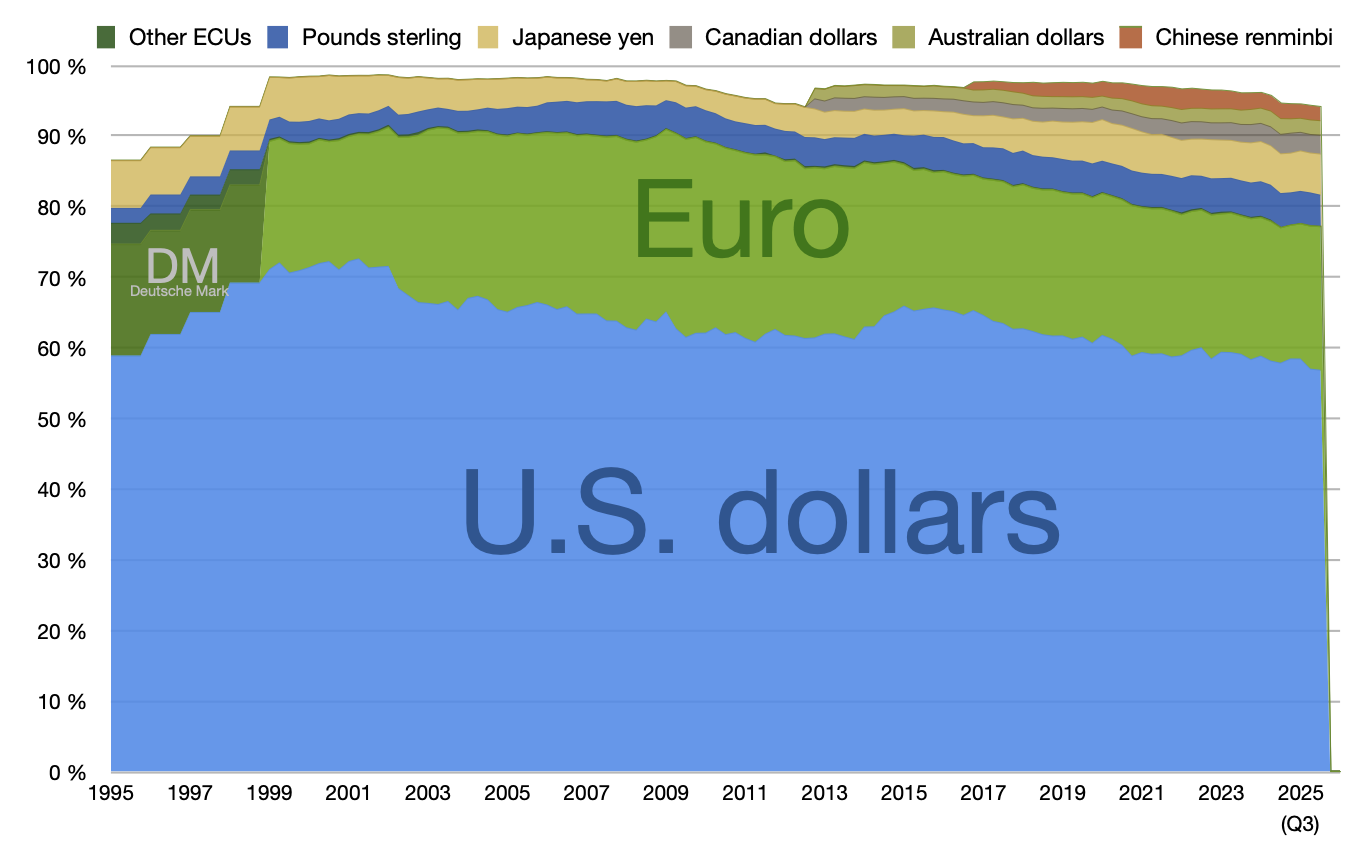
Distribution of global reserve currencies

A reserve currency is a foreign currency that is held by governments, central banks or other monetary authorities as part of their foreign exchange reserves. The reserve currency can be used in international transactions, international investments and all aspects of the global economy. It is often considered a hard currency or safe-haven currency.

Before World War II, foreign exchange such as the British pound made up less than 30% of global reserves, gold being the primary exchange asset held by central banks. However, by the middle of the 20th century, the United States dollar had become the world's dominant reserve currency.

Because other countries must obtain the reserve currency to pay for goods and services (and bear the associated, albeit small, transaction costs) the issuing country can purchase everyday goods at comparatively low prices. At the same time, strong global demand for the reserve currency enables the issuing country to borrow on more favorable terms, including lower interest rates.

== History ==
Reserve currencies have come and gone with the evolution of the world's geopolitical order. International currencies in the past have (in addition to those discussed below) included the Greek drachma, coined in the fifth century BC, the Roman denarius, the Byzantine solidus, the Islamic dinar of the Middle Ages, and the French franc.

The Venetian ducat and the Florentine florin were the gold-based currencies of choice between Europe and the Arab world from the 13th to the 16th centuries, since gold was easier than silver to mint in standard sizes and transport over long distances. It was the Spanish silver dollar, however, which created the first true global reserve currency recognized in Europe, Asia and the Americas from the 16th to the 19th centuries due to abundant silver supplies from Spanish America.

While the Dutch guilder was a reserve currency of somewhat lesser scope, used between Europe and the territories of the Dutch colonial empire from the 17th to 18th centuries, it was also a silver standard currency fed with the output of Spanish-American mines flowing through the Spanish Netherlands. The Dutch, through the Bank of Amsterdam, were the first to establish a reserve currency whose monetary unit was stabilized using practices familiar to modern central banking (as opposed to the Spanish dollar stabilized through American mine output and Spanish fiat) and which can be considered as a precursor to modern-day monetary policy.

The Bank of England was established in 1694, and the Bank of France in the 18th century. The British pound sterling, in particular, was poised to dislodge the Spanish dollar's hegemony as the rest of the world transitioned to the gold standard in the last quarter of the 19th century. At that point, the United Kingdom was the primary exporter of manufactured goods and services, and over 60% of world trade was invoiced in pounds sterling. British banks were also expanding overseas; London was the world centre for insurance and commodity markets and British capital was the leading source of foreign investment around the world; sterling soon became the standard currency used for international commercial transactions. On continental Europe, the bimetallic standard of the French franc remained the unifying currency of several European countries and their colonies under the Latin Monetary Union, which was established in 1865. Peru, Colombia and Venezuela also adopted the system in the 1860s and 1870s.

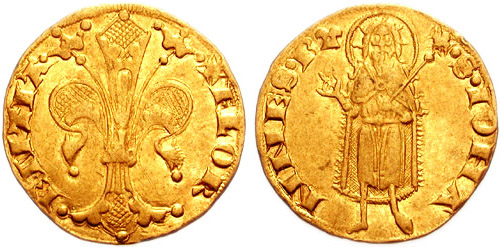
Florentine florin, 1347

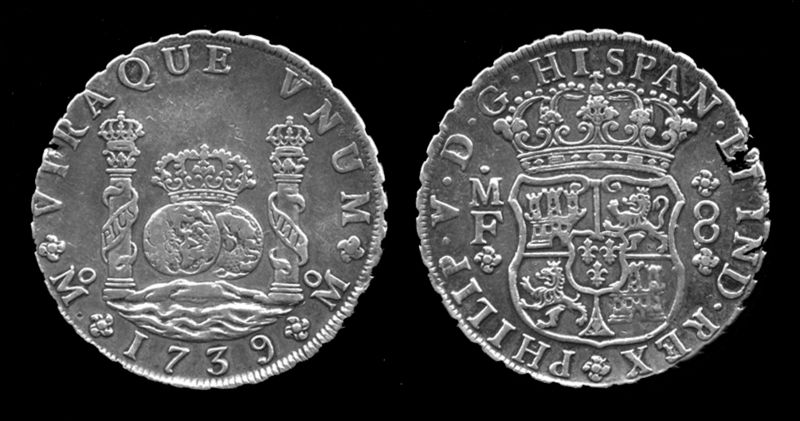
Spanish piece of eight of Philip V, 1739

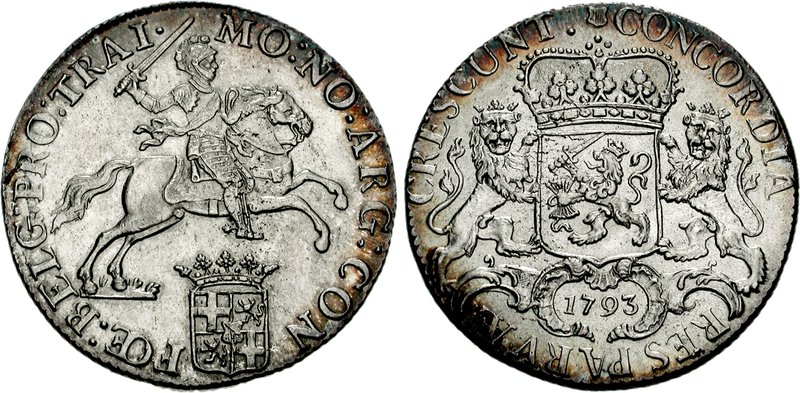
Silver ducaton worth 3-3.15 Dutch guilders, 1793

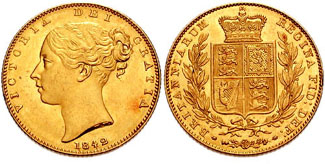
Sovereign (£1 coin) of Queen Victoria, 1842

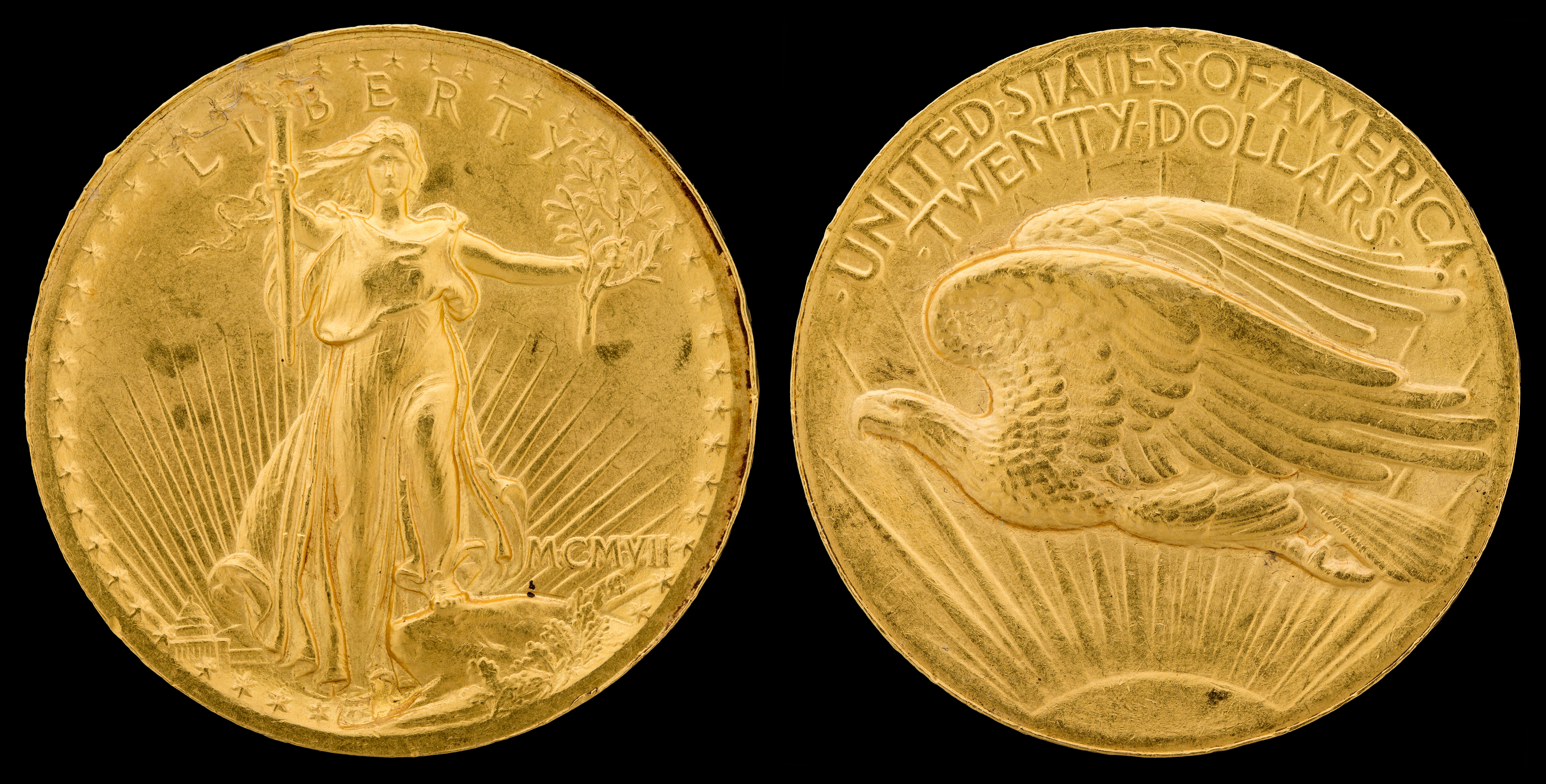
US double eagle ($20 gold coin), 1907

Attempts were made in the interwar period to restore the gold standard. The British Gold Standard Act reintroduced the gold bullion standard in 1925, followed by many other countries. This led to relative stability, followed by deflation, but because of the onset of the Great Depression and other factors, global trade greatly declined and the gold standard fell. Speculative attacks on the pound forced Britain entirely off the gold standard in 1931.

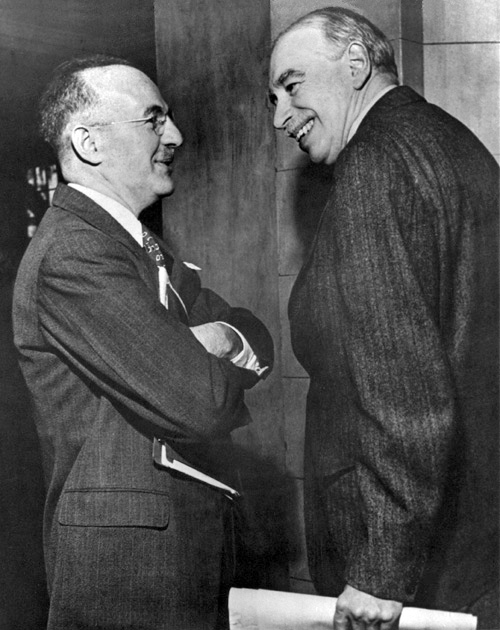
John Maynard Keynes (right) and Harry Dexter White helped to draft the provisions of the post-war financial system. Here, they meet at the inaugural meeting of the International Monetary Fund, 1946.

After World War II, the international financial system was governed by a formal agreement, the Bretton Woods system. Under this system, the United States dollar (USD) was placed deliberately as the anchor of the system, with the US government guaranteeing other central banks that they could sell their US dollar reserves at a fixed rate for gold.

In the late 1960s and early 1970s, the system suffered setbacks ostensibly due to problems pointed out by the Triffin dilemma—the conflict of economic interests that arises between short-term domestic objectives and long-term international objectives when a national currency also serves as a world reserve currency.

Additionally, in 1971 President Richard Nixon suspended the convertibility of the USD to gold, thus creating a fully fiat global reserve currency system. However, gold has persisted as a significant reserve asset since the collapse of the classical gold standard.

Following the 2020 economic recession, the IMF opined about the emergence of "A New Bretton Woods Moment" which could imply the need for a new global reserve currency system.

== Global currency reserves ==
The IMF publishes the aggregated Currency Composition of Foreign Exchange Reserves (COFER) each quarter. In 2022, IMF researchers reported that while the dollar remains dominant, its share has declined over two decades as central banks diversified into “nontraditional” reserve currencies such as the Australian and Canadian dollars, the Swedish krona, and the South Korean won. The reserves of the individual reporting countries and institutions are confidential. Thus the following table is a limited view about the global currency reserves that only deals with allocated (i.e. reported) reserves:

Currency composition of official foreign exchange reserves (1965–2025)
Currency	2025	2024	2023	2022	2021	2020	2019	2018	2017	2016	2015	2014	2013	2012	2011	2010	2009	2008	2007	2006	2005	2004	2003	2002	2001	2000	1999	1998	1997	1996	1995	1990	1985	1980	1975	1970	1965
United States dollar	56.77%	58.52%	58.98%	58.95%	59.40%	59.53%	61.32%	62.07%	62.71%	64.68%	64.15%	62.68%	61.72%	61.84%	62.51%	61.94%	62.19%	62.87%	62.60%	63.67%	64.89%	63.32%	63.53%	64.94%	70.78%	69.74%	71.01%	69.28%	65.10%	61.98%	58.96%	47.14%	56.66%	57.88%	84.61%	84.85%	72.93%
Euro	20.25%	18.92%	19.21%	19.73%	19.82%	20.56%	19.82%	20.03%	19.80%	18.93%	19.40%	20.46%	21.47%	21.45%	21.73%	22.91%	24.05%	23.42%	23.32%	22.62%	21.89%	23.14%	23.13%	22.92%	18.41%	17.54%	17.90%										
Japanese yen	5.78%	5.62%	5.44%	5.44%	5.50%	6.04%	5.82%	5.09%	4.78%	3.98%	3.90%	4.08%	4.09%	4.31%	4.09%	4.09%	3.35%	4.26%	4.17%	4.50%	4.80%	5.65%	6.13%	5.60%	5.40%	6.56%	6.37%	6.24%	5.77%	6.71%	6.77%	9.40%	8.69%	3.93%	0.61%		
Pound sterling	4.41%	4.60%	4.79%	5.04%	4.88%	4.76%	4.67%	4.51%	4.74%	4.67%	5.17%	4.71%	4.78%	4.73%	4.62%	4.78%	5.00%	4.91%	5.66%	5.30%	4.75%	4.59%	3.87%	3.67%	3.11%	3.41%	2.89%	2.66%	2.58%	2.68%	2.11%	2.39%	2.03%	2.40%	3.42%	11.36%	25.76%
Canadian dollar	2.49%	2.83%	2.51%	2.49%	2.43%	2.12%	1.89%	1.84%	2.12%	2.13%	2.09%	2.30%	2.34%	2.09%																							
Australian dollar	2.03%	2.04%	2.09%	2.24%	2.01%	1.98%	1.84%	1.74%	1.97%	1.87%	1.83%	1.80%	1.90%	1.67%																							
Renminbi	1.95%	2.06%	2.34%	2.55%	2.85%	2.32%	2.03%	1.96%	1.23%	1.00%																											
Swiss franc	0.19%	0.19%	0.20%	0.22%	0.16%	0.16%	0.14%	0.13%	0.18%	0.18%	0.28%	0.31%	0.34%	0.30%	0.20%	0.24%	0.21%	0.23%	0.21%	0.21%	0.21%	0.21%	0.23%	0.39%	0.24%	0.30%	0.23%	0.33%	0.35%	0.30%	0.33%	0.84%	1.40%	2.25%	1.34%	0.61%	
European Currency Unit																												1.30%	6.07%	7.08%	8.53%	11.64%	14.00%	17.46%			
Deutsche Mark																												13.79%	14.48%	14.67%	15.75%	19.83%	13.74%	12.92%	6.62%	1.94%	0.17%
French franc																												1.62%	1.44%	1.85%	2.35%	2.71%	0.58%	0.97%	1.16%	0.73%	1.11%
Dutch guilder																												0.27%	0.35%	0.24%	0.32%	1.15%	0.78%	0.89%	0.66%	0.08%	
Other currencies	6.13%	5.23%	4.44%	3.34%	2.95%	2.52%	2.46%	2.63%	2.48%	2.57%	3.17%	3.66%	3.36%	3.60%	6.85%	6.04%	5.21%	4.32%	4.03%	3.69%	3.47%	3.09%	3.10%	2.47%	2.07%	2.45%	1.60%	4.50%	3.86%	4.48%	4.87%	4.89%	2.13%	1.29%	1.58%	0.43%	0.03%

The percental composition of currencies of official foreign exchange reserves from 1995 to 2025.

== Theory ==
Economists debate whether a single reserve currency will always dominate the global economy. Many have recently argued that one currency will almost always dominate due to network externalities (sometimes called "the network effect"), especially in the field of invoicing trade and denominating foreign debt securities, meaning that there are strong incentives to conform to the choice that dominates the marketplace. The argument is that, in the absence of sufficiently large shocks, a currency that dominates the marketplace will not lose much ground to challengers.

However, some economists, such as Barry Eichengreen, argue that this is not as true when it comes to the denomination of official reserves because the network externalities are not strong. As long as the currency's market is sufficiently liquid, the benefits of reserve diversification are strong, as it insures against large capital losses. The implication is that the world may well soon begin to move away from a financial system dominated uniquely by the US dollar. In the first half of the 20th century, multiple currencies did share the status as primary reserve currencies. Although the British Sterling was the largest currency, both the French franc and the German mark shared large portions of the market until the First World War, after which the mark was replaced by the dollar. Since the Second World War, the dollar has dominated official reserves, but this is likely a reflection of the unusual domination of the American economy during this period, as well as official discouragement of reserve status from the potential rivals, Germany and Japan.

The top reserve currency is generally selected by the banking community for the strength and stability of the economy in which it is used. Thus, as a currency becomes less stable, or its economy becomes less dominant, bankers may over time abandon it for a currency issued by a larger or more stable economy. This can take a relatively long time, as recognition is important in determining a reserve currency. For example, it took many years after the United States overtook the United Kingdom as the world's largest economy before the dollar overtook the pound sterling as the dominant global reserve currency. In 1944, when the US dollar was chosen as the world reference currency at Bretton Woods, it was only the second currency in global reserves.

The G8 also frequently issued public statements as to exchange rates. In the past due to the Plaza Accord, its predecessor bodies could directly manipulate rates to reverse large trade deficits.

== Major reserve currencies ==
Currency symbols of the four most widely held reserve currencies, L–R: United States dollar, euro, Japanese yen, pound sterling

=== United States dollar ===
The United States dollar is the most widely held currency in the allocated reserves. As of the fourth quarter of 2022, the USD accounted for 58.36% of official foreign exchange reserves. This makes it somewhat easier for the United States to run higher trade deficits with greatly postponed economic ramifications or even postponing a currency crisis. Central bank US dollar reserves, however, are small compared to private holdings of such debt. If non-United States holders of dollar-denominated assets shifted holdings to assets denominated in other currencies, there could be serious consequences for the US economy. The decline of the pound sterling took place gradually over time, and the markets involved adjusted accordingly. However, the US dollar remains the preferred reserve currency because of its stability due to scale and liquidity.

The US dollar's position in global reserves is often questioned because of the growing share of unallocated reserves, and because of the doubt regarding dollar stability in the long term. However, the dollar's share in the world's foreign-exchange trades rose slightly from 85% in 2010 to 87% in 2013.

The dollar's role as the largest reserve currency allows the United States to impose unilateral sanctions against actions performed between other countries, for example the American fine against BNP Paribas for violations of U.S. sanctions that were not laws of France or the other countries involved in the transactions. In 2014, China and Russia signed a 150 billion yuan central bank liquidity swap line agreement to get around European and American sanctions on their behaviors.

In 2025, after the implementation of tariffs in the second Trump administration, financial institutions began to rethink the role of US Dollar as reserve currency.

=== Euro ===
The euro is currently the second most commonly held reserve currency, representing about 20% of international foreign currency reserves. After World War II and the rebuilding of the German economy, the German mark gained the status of the second most important reserve currency after the US dollar. When the euro was introduced on 1 January 1999, replacing the mark, French franc and ten other European currencies, it inherited the status of a major reserve currency from the mark. Since then, its contribution to official reserves has risen continually as banks seek to diversify their reserves, and trade in the eurozone continues to expand.

After the euro's share of global official foreign exchange reserves approached 25% as of year-end 2006 (vs 65% for the U.S. dollar; see table above), some experts have predicted that the euro could replace the dollar as the world's primary reserve currency. See Alan Greenspan, 2007; and Frankel, Chinn (2006) who explained how it could happen by 2020. However, as of 2022 none of this has come to fruition due to the European debt crisis which engulfed the PIIGS countries from 2009 to 2014. Instead the euro's stability and future existence was put into doubt, and its share of global reserves was cut to 19% by year-end 2015 (vs 66% for the USD). As of year-end 2020 these figures stand at 21% for EUR and 59% for USD.

=== Pound sterling ===
The United Kingdom's pound sterling was the primary reserve currency of much of the world in the 19th century and the first half of the 20th century. That status ended after the UK almost bankrupted itself fighting World War I and World War II, and its place was taken by the United States dollar.

In the 1950s, 55% of global reserves were still held in sterling; but the share was 10% lower within 20 years.

The establishment of the U.S. Federal Reserve System in 1913 and the economic vacuum following the World Wars facilitated the emergence of the United States as an economic superpower.

As of 30 September 2021, the pound sterling represented the fourth largest proportion (by USD equivalent value) of foreign currency reserves and 4.78% of those reserves.

=== Japanese yen ===
Japan's yen is part of the International Monetary Fund's (IMF) special drawing rights (SDR) valuation. The SDR currency value is determined daily by the IMF, based on the exchange rates of the currencies making up the basket, as quoted at noon at the London market. The valuation basket is reviewed and adjusted every five years.

The SDR Values and yen conversion for government procurement are used by the Japan External Trade Organization for Japan's official procurement in international trade.

=== Chinese renminbi ===
The Chinese renminbi officially became a supplementary forex reserve asset on 1 October 2016. It represents 10.92% of the IMF's Special Drawing Rights (SDR) currency basket. The Chinese renminbi is the third reserve currency after the U.S. dollar and euro within the basket of currencies in the SDR. (As shown in the table above, the renminbi is the seventh largest component of international currency reserves.)

=== Canadian dollar ===
A number of central banks (and commercial banks) keep Canadian dollars as a reserve currency. In the economy of the Americas, the Canadian dollar plays a similar role to that played by the Australian dollar (AUD) in the Asia-Pacific region. The Canadian dollar (as a regional reserve currency for banking) has been an important part of the British, French and Dutch Caribbean states' economies and finance systems since the 1950s. The Canadian dollar is also held by many central banks in Central America and South America. It is held in Latin America because of remittances and international trade in the region.

Because Canada's primary foreign-trade relationship is with the United States, Canadian consumers, economists, and many businesses primarily define and value the Canadian dollar in terms of the United States dollar. Thus, by observing how the Canadian dollar floats in terms of the US dollar, foreign-exchange economists can indirectly observe internal behaviours and patterns in the US economy that could not be seen by direct observation. Also, because it is considered a petrodollar, the Canadian dollar has only fully evolved into a global reserve currency since the 1970s, when it was floated against all other world currencies.

The Canadian dollar, from 2013 to 2017, was ranked fifth among foreign currency reserves in the world, overtaking the Australian dollar, but is then being overtaken by the Chinese Yuan.

=== Swiss franc ===
The Swiss franc, despite gaining ground among the world's foreign-currency reserves and often being used in denominating foreign loans, cannot be considered as a world reserve currency, since the share of all foreign exchange reserves held in Swiss francs has historically been well below 0.5%. The daily trading market turnover of the franc, however, ranked fifth, or about 3.4%, among all currencies in a 2007 survey by the Bank for International Settlements.

== Calls for an alternative reserve currency ==
John Maynard Keynes proposed the bancor, a supranational currency to be used as unit of account in international trade, as reserve currency under the Bretton Woods Conference of 1945. The bancor was rejected in favor of the U.S. dollar. A report released by the United Nations Conference on Trade and Development in 2010, called for abandoning the U.S. dollar as the single major reserve currency. The report states that the new reserve system should not be based on a single currency or even multiple national currencies but instead permit the emission of international liquidity to create a more stable global financial system.

Countries such as Russia and China, central banks, and economic analysts and groups, such as the Gulf Cooperation Council, have expressed a desire to see an independent new currency replace the dollar as the reserve currency.

On 10 July 2009, Russian President Dmitry Medvedev proposed a new 'World currency' at the G8 meeting in London as an alternative reserve currency to replace the dollar.

At the beginning of the 21st century, gold and crude oil were still priced in dollars, which helps export inflation and has brought complaints about OPEC's policies of managing oil quotas to maintain dollar price stability. In 2000, Iraq was the first OPEC nation to switch from the US Dollar to the euro for oil export pricing.

Due to the Russian invasion of Ukraine and international sanctions, Russia has used the United Arab Emirates dirham as a neutral currency when selling oil to India.

=== Special drawing rights ===
Some have proposed the use of the International Monetary Fund's (IMF) special drawing rights (SDRs) as a reserve. The value of SDRs are calculated from a basket determined by the IMF of key international currencies, which as of 2026 consisted of the United States dollar, Euro, Japanese yen, Pound sterling and PRC Renminbi.

Ahead of a G20 summit in 2009, China distributed a paper that proposed using SDRs for clearing international payments and eventually as a reserve currency to replace the U.S. dollar.

On 3 September 2009, the United Nations Conference on Trade and Development (UNCTAD) issued a report calling for a new reserve currency based on the SDR, managed by a new global reserve bank. The IMF released a report in February 2011, stating that using SDRs "could help stabilize the global financial system." The SDR itself is only a minuscule fraction of global currency reserves.

=== Cryptocurrencies ===
According to some cryptocurrency proponents, digital cryptocurrencies could potentially replace fiat currencies as a possible global reserve currency.

== See also ==
- Commodity currency – Currency moving with commodity prices
- Cryptocurrency – Digital asset using a distributed ledger
- Exorbitant privilege – Economic gain by reserve currency nation
- Fiat money – Currency not backed by any commodity
- Floating exchange rate – Currency value as determined by foreign market events
- Foreign exchange reserves – Money held by a central bank to pay debts, if needed
- Hard currency – Reliable and stable globally-traded currency
- Krugerrand – South African gold coin
- Seigniorage – Profit from minting money
- Special drawing rights – Supplementary foreign exchange reserve assets defined and maintained by the IMF
- Triffin dilemma – Conflict of economic interests in countries with global reserve currencies
  - Impossible trinity – Trilemma in international economics
