= India and the International Monetary Fund =

International relationship

India on a map

India joined the International Monetary Fund (IMF) on December 27, 1945, as a founding member. In the decades following independence, India made several drawings on IMF resources to address balance of payments difficulties, particularly during the 1950s and 1960s. The most notable engagements occurred in 1981, when India obtained a large Extended Fund Facility arrangement, and in 1991, when it borrowed to overcome a severe balance of payments crisis.Since the early 2000s, India has not borrowed from the IMF and has instead contributed to its financial resources, while continuing to participate in discussions on global economic governance.

== Key financial engagements ==
Post-independence, India faced significant balance of payments challenges, particularly in the years following partition and during the conflicts with Pakistan in 1965 and 1971.The International Monetary Fund (IMF) provided crucial financial assistance during these periods to help stabilize the Indian economy. In 1981, India received a substantial loan from the IMF to address a severe foreign exchange crisis, marking a period of significant financial engagement as the country grappled with persistent deficits. In the early 1990s, India encountered another severe balance of payments crisis and sought the IMF's assistance. The support from the IMF contributed to stabilizing the economy by offering financial resources and policy recommendations. These recommendations included structural reforms such as the devaluation of the rupee, reduction of fiscal deficits, and liberalization of trade policies, which helped India overcome the crisis and set the stage for sustained economic growth. India's proactive engagement with the IMF is evident in its response to the 1991 crisis. By adhering to the IMF's conditions, India implemented significant economic reforms, including the liberalization of its trade regime, deregulation, and privatizing state-owned enterprises. These reforms played an important role in transforming India into one of the fastest-growing economies globally and enhancing its role in the international economic landscape.

== Current status and contributions ==
India has not taken financial assistance from the IMF since 1993, completing all repayments by 2000. This financial independence from IMF assistance highlights India's improved economic stability and resilience. India's current quota in the IMF stands at 13114.4 million Special Drawing Rights (SDRs), making it one of the largest contributors and giving it significant voting power. This quota determines India's financial commitment to the IMF and its voting power, which is 2.63% of the total voting shares. India's financial obligations to IMF initiatives, such as the Notes Purchase Agreement (NPA) and the New Arrangement to Borrow (NAB), underscore its strategic role in supporting the IMF's lending capacity and global financial stability efforts. Notably, during the 2009 London Summit of the Group of Twenty (G-20), India pledged to invest up to $10 billion through the Notes Purchase Agreement (NPA). This investment supports the IMF's capacity to provide financial assistance globally.

== Governance and representation ==
The Finance Minister of India serves as the ex-officio Governor on the Board of Governors of the IMF, with the Governor of the Reserve Bank of India (RBI) acting as the Alternate Governor. This high-level representation ensures that India's interests and perspectives are adequately voiced in IMF decisions. Its economic performance and quota contributions influence India's representation and voting power at the IMF. For example, the 14th General Review of Quotas, which came into effect in 2016, was a significant milestone where India's quota and voting power saw substantial adjustments. Moreover, India's involvement in the IMF extends beyond financial contributions.The country has actively participated in policy discussions and decision-making processes, contributing to the formulation of global economic policies and mechanisms for financial stability. For example, India has emphasized the need for the IMF to consider the specific developmental needs and economic conditions of emerging markets when designing financial assistance programs and policy recommendations.

== Strategic importance ==
India's relationship with the IMF has been instrumental in navigating economic crises and implementing critical structural reforms. The independent scrutiny and advice from IMF specialists have significantly shaped India's financial policies and development strategies. This tailored approach to India's economic needs exemplifies the IMF's evolving role. During the 2008 financial crisis, the IMF provided India with policy advice that helped mitigate the impact of the worldwide downturn. This included measures to strengthen financial regulation and improve fiscal management, which were crucial in maintaining economic stability and promoting recovery. India's engagement with the IMF underscores its significant role in the global economic landscape. By actively participating in IMF initiatives and contributing to its resources, India has enhanced its influence in international financial affairs and strengthened its position as a significant global economy. For instance, India's liberalization policies post-1991, supported by the IMF, helped it emerge as a key exporter in various sectors, thereby gaining a stronger voice in international trade negotiations and forums.

== Criticism Of IMF Intervention ==
There are also lots of criticisms of the IMF intervention in developing countries. These criticisms mainly focus on the adverse effects of loan conditions. Structural adjustments mandated by the IMF often lead to increased poverty and inequality. For instance, privatization, trade liberalization, and fiscal austerity reforms tend to reduce government spending on social services, increase unemployment, and raise the costs of essential services. These measures disproportionately affect the poorest segments of society, exacerbating poverty and social inequality. The one criticism connected with the Indian economy is that the IMF's interventions are often seen as one-size-fits-all solutions that do not consider the unique socio-economic contexts of the borrowing countries. In India, the IMF's emphasis on fiscal austerity and liberalization measures has sometimes led to economic destabilization rather than stabilization. For instance, the conditionality requiring fiscal consolidation can constrain public investment in critical sectors like health and education, vital for long-term economic growth and social stability. A critical study from the Indian Institute of Management Bangalore argues that the IMF's approach lacks customization and fails to address the specific needs and challenges of the Indian economy, leading to suboptimal outcomes.
