= Czech Republic and the International Monetary Fund =

Czech Republic and the International Monetary Fund are the international relations between the Czech Republic and the International Monetary Fund (IMF). The Czech Republic became a member of the International Monetary Fund in January 1993. The Czech Republic has no outstanding loans after paying of all debts to the International Monetary Fund in 1994 and achieved proper currency convertibility in compliance with Article VIII of the Agreement on 1 October 1995.

== Czechoslovakia and Bretton Woods ==
Czechoslovakia was one of the original participants in the Bretton Woods financial conferences in 1944. In late July, the United Nations Monetary and Financial Conference had released charters which outlined the aims and operating procedures of the IMF and the IBRD. Czechoslovakia became a member of the Fund on December 27, 1945, when the IBRD Articles of Agreement were signed and ratified by the delegates from twenty-one countries. Although initially Czechoslovakia's relationship with the IMF looked promising, the communist take-over that took place in 1948 substantially impeded this development. Czechoslovakia introduced a centrally planned economic system and shifted the country's foreign political policies away from the West and towards the East. Czechoslovakia was then expelled from the Bretton-Woods Institutions due to a pattern of refusing to inform the IMF on the country's economic developments and denied monetary and economic arrangements with the IMF. The country's membership in the fund was canceled in December 1954 until September 1990, when the CSFR or Czech and Slovak Federal Republic, re-adopted the International Monetary Fund's Articles of Agreement. This renewed the former Czechoslovakia's membership in the Bretton Woods Institutions and the CSFR became the 152nd member of the IMF. After the nation of Czechoslovakia split into the Czech Republic and Slovakia, the Czech Republic officially joined the International Monetary Fund on January 1, 1993.

== IMF constituency ==
The Czech Republic joined the Central and Eastern European IMF constituency in 2012 which allowed the Czech Republic the possibility of appointing an executive director in the IMF Executive Board for the second time since the IMF's inception in 1944. One of the IMF's founding countries, the former Czechoslovakia, appointed an executive director in 1946. This constituency allows for members to appoint an executive director for two years under an agreed rotation schedule. This agreement was approved as a result of IMF reform which allowed for better representation of emerging countries. The aim is to ensure that IMF policies reflect the shifting economic potential of emerging countries in Central and Eastern Europe.

== Article IV consultations ==
One significant areas of cooperation between the IMF and the Czech Republic are the Article IV consultations. These reports are the combined efforts of IMF staff and Czech officials in order to evaluate the Czech economy and propose any recommendations for further economic development.

The 2018 and 2019 Article IV reports saw the Czech economy have strong and stable growth. The unemployment rate fell to a record low of 2.3 percent in 2018 while inflation levels are staying near the target rate at a steady 2 percent. The IMF revealed some concerns over labor shortages putting constraints on future growth however, the IMF is confident in how integrated the Czech economy is in the Euro supply chains. The IMF also deemed the Czech banking system as "stable... well capitalized, and well placed... toward investment". The IMF also highlighted an increase in cases of money laundering in EU countries and recommends authorities monitor non-resident accounts, identify the source of foreign funds, and improve real estate data collecting methods. From the years 2018 to 2019 the IMF recommended that the Czech Republic apply a neutral fiscal stance that focuses growth friendly spending choices, specifically noting social spending such as pensions and healthcare. The 2021 consultation brought up concerns over inflation and increased prices in the housing market led to policies focusing on these areas.

== COVID era ==
The IMF saw the Czech economy enter the pandemic on stable ground amid the surge in COVID infections. After a short reopening period in 2020 the pandemic continues to pose a challenge. In late 2020 following a second wave of infections, a nationwide quarantine, mandatory testing, and the closing of schools and businesses were introduced. Fortunately the labor market weathered the pandemic with unemployment peaking at only 3.3 percent in 2021. The IMF notes that the economic impact of COVID-19 was less severe in the Czech Republic than in other areas of Europe. IMF directors praised the resiliency of Czech banks but pointed out that there are many vulnerabilities especially in residential mortgages. The IMF recommended that the Czech government focus on the Innovation Strategy and National Investment Plan in order to accelerate the growth in the transportation and energy sectors. IMF directors are still wary of labor shortages and advocate for policies that attract foreign workers. IMF staff recommends introducing the Qualified Workers Program which provides seasonal visas for workers. Streamlining the administrative process for obtaining employment and a visa was a significant point made by the IMF directors in the 2021 Article IV Consultation report.
