= Triffin dilemma =

Conflict of economic interests in countries with global reserve currencies

In international finance, the Triffin dilemma (sometimes the Triffin paradox) is the conflict of economic interests that arises between short-term domestic and long-term international objectives for countries whose currencies serve as global reserve currencies. This dilemma was identified in the 1960s by Belgian-American economist Robert Triffin. He noted that a country whose currency is the global reserve currency, held by other nations as foreign exchange (FX) reserves to support international trade, must somehow supply the world with its currency in order to fulfill world demand for these FX reserves. This supply function is nominally accomplished by international trade, with the country holding reserve currency status being required to run an inevitable trade deficit.

After going off the gold standard in 1971 and setting up the petrodollar system later in the 1970s, the United States accepted the burden of such an ongoing trade deficit in 1985 with its permanent transformation from a creditor to a debtor nation. The U.S. goods trade deficit is currently on the order of one trillion dollars per year. Such a continuing drain to the United States in its balance of trade leads to ongoing tension between its national trade policies and its global monetary policy to maintain the U.S. dollar as the current global reserve currency. Alternatives to international trade that address this tension include direct transfer of dollars via foreign aid and swap lines.

The Triffin dilemma is usually cited to articulate the problems with the role of the U.S. dollar as the reserve currency under the worldwide Bretton Woods system established in 1944. John Maynard Keynes had anticipated this difficulty and had advocated the use of a global reserve currency called 'Bancor'. Historically, the IMF's SDRs have been the closest thing to the proposed Bancor but they have not been adopted widely enough to replace the dollar as the global reserve currency.

During the 2008 financial crisis, the governor of the People's Bank of China named the reserve currency status of the US dollar as a contributing factor to global savings and investment imbalances that led to the crisis. As such, the Triffin Dilemma is related to the global saving glut hypothesis because the dollar's reserve currency role exacerbates the U.S. current account deficit due to heightened demand for dollars.

== History ==
=== Onset during Bretton Woods era ===
In 1959, due to money flowing out of the country through the Marshall Plan, U.S. military budget and Americans buying foreign goods, the number of U.S. dollars in circulation exceeded the amount of gold that was backing them.

By the autumn of 1960, an ounce of gold could be exchanged for US$40 in the London market even though the official rate in the United States was US$35. This price difference was due to price controls on gold in the US: The official price of gold in US$ had not changed in 27 years, leading to a difference between the domestic value of the US dollar and its value in foreign markets. The official price had been fixed following the 1933 enactment of Executive Order 6102, under which the US government purchased gold from US citizens under threat of fines and/or jail time at a rate of US$20.67/oz, then quickly revalued the gold to US$35/oz.

The solution to the Triffin dilemma for the United States was to reduce dollars in circulation by cutting the deficit and raising interest rates to attract dollars back into the country. Some economists believed both these tactics, however, would drag the U.S. economy into recession.

In support of the Bretton Woods system and to exert control over the exchange rate of gold, the United States initiated the London Gold Pool and the General Agreements to Borrow (GAB) in 1961 which sustained the system until 1967, when runs on gold and the devaluation of the pound sterling were followed by the demise of the system.

=== The balance-of-payments dilemma ===
In order to maintain the Bretton Woods system, the US had to run a balance of payments current account deficit to provide liquidity for the conversion of gold into U.S. dollars. With more US dollars in the system than were backed with gold under the Bretton Woods agreement, the US dollar was overvalued relative to gold. The gold reserves of the United States were decreasing as foreign governments converted US dollars to gold and took it offshore. Foreign speculators did not directly contribute to the gold flow out of the US, as under the Bretton Woods Agreement, only governments could exchange US currency for physical gold. Additionally, while the Bretton Woods Agreement was in place, direct speculation by US citizens did not contribute to the price imbalance and arbitrage opportunity due to wide disparity of gold prices between the US and other markets, since US citizens were banned from owning any gold other than jewelry following Executive Order 6102, enacted in 1933 by President Franklin D. Roosevelt to allow the US Government to confiscate all gold coinage, gold certificates, and gold bullion held by any citizen.

After confiscating the gold of its citizens in 1933, the US government fixed the price of gold at US$35/oz. As with all price controls, this caused supply and demand imbalances and an arbitrage opportunity which rapidly depleted the United States gold reserves. This led to less gold in the country and caused the US Dollar to become even more overvalued relative to the US gold reserves, leading to a self-propagating cycle. Furthermore, the US had to run a balance of payments current account surplus to maintain confidence in the US dollar.

As a result, the United States was faced with a dilemma because it is not possible to run a balance of payments current account deficit and surplus at the same time.

=== The Nixon shock ===
In August 1971, President Richard Nixon acknowledged the demise of the Bretton Woods system. Due to the run up in war-spending deficits and the declining economy at the time, various countries began to request their dollars be redeemed for bullion. A bullion run on the Federal Reserve had quietly started and Georges Pompidou, famously, sent a warship in August 1971 to New York to take the gold back to France. Nixon announced that the dollar could no longer be exchanged for gold, which eventually became known as the Nixon shock. Although it was announced as a temporary measure, it was to remain in effect. The "gold window" was closed.

== Implication in 2008 financial crisis ==
During the 2008 financial crisis, the governor of the People's Bank of China explicitly named the Triffin Dilemma as the root cause of the economic disorder, in a speech titled Reform the International Monetary System. Zhou Xiaochuan's speech on 29 March 2009 proposed strengthening existing global currency controls, through the IMF.

This would involve a gradual move away from the U.S. dollar as a reserve currency and towards the use of IMF special drawing rights (SDRs) as a global reserve currency.

Zhou argued that part of the reason for the original Bretton Woods system breaking down was the refusal to adopt Keynes' bancor which would have been a special international reserve currency to be used instead of the dollar.

American economist Brad DeLong claims that on almost every point where Keynes was overruled by the Americans during the Bretton Woods negotiations, he was later proved correct by events.

Zhou's proposal attracted much international attention; in a November 2009 article published in Foreign Affairs magazine, economist C. Fred Bergsten argued that Zhou's suggestion or a similar change to the International Monetary System would be in the best interests of both the United States and the rest of the world. While Zhou's proposal has not yet been adopted, leaders meeting in April at the 2009 G20 London summit agreed to allow 250 billion SDRs to be created by the IMF, to be distributed to all IMF members according to each country's voting rights.

On April 13, 2010, the Strategy, Policy and Review Department of the IMF published a comprehensive report examining these aforementioned problems as well as other world reserve currency considerations, recommending that the world adopt a global reserve currency (bancor) and that a global central bank be established to administer such a currency. In this report, the current issues with having a national global reserve currency are addressed. The merits, difficulties and effectiveness of establishing a multi-currency reserve system are weighed against that of the SDRs, or "basket currency" strategy, and those of establishing this new "global reserve currency". A new multilateral framework and "multi-polar system" for managing capital flows and national debts is also called for, but the IMF cautions that it prefers a gradual shift to this new framework, rather than a sudden change.

== See also ==
- Bretton Woods system
- Dollar hegemony
- Exorbitant privilege
- Reserve currency
- Impossible trinity (trilemma)
