= Rybar (surname) =

Rybář (feminine Rybářová) in Czech and Rybár (feminine Rybárová) in Slovak is a surname, literally meaning 'fisherman'. Notable people with this surname include:

== Rybár ==
- Patrik Rybár (born 1993), Slovak ice hockey goaltender
- Pavol Rybár (born 1971), Slovak ice hockey goaltender

== Rybář ==
- Jan Rybář (1931–2021), Czech Roman Catholic priest
- Jana Rybářová (synchronized swimmer) (born 1978), Czech Olympic synchronized swimmer
- Jana Rybářová (actress) (1936–1957), Czech film actress
- Otokar Rybář (1865–1927), Austrian and Yugoslavian politician, diplomat and statesman
- Silvie Rybářová (born 1985), Czech open water swimmer
- Vladimir Rybář (1894–1946), Yugoslav diplomat and lawyer

== Rybar ==
- Peter Rybar (1913–2002), Czech-Swiss violinist
- Valerian Rybar (1919–1990), American interior designer

== See also ==
- The dictionary definition of rybár at Wiktionary
- The dictionary definition of rybář at Wiktionary
