= Vladimir Rybář =

- Born: November 17, 1894; Sežana, Austria-Hungary
- Died: November 14, 1946 (aged 51); Oslo, Norway

Vladimir Rybář (November 17, 1894 – November 17, 1946) was a Yugoslav diplomat and lawyer. He represented Yugoslavia diplomatically, notably at the Bretton Woods Conference in July 1944 and the United Nations Relief and Rehabilitation Administration. Rybář also held various positions at diplomatic missions across Europe and North America.

== Early life ==
Vladimir Rybář was born on November 17, 1894, in Sežana, Austria-Hungary (present day Slovenia). His father, Otokar Rybář, was a diplomat and lawyer. A year after his birth, Rybář and his family moved to Trieste where he graduated from secondary schooling in 1914. Due to the fact that Rybář was an invalid, he was not conscripted into the army at the onset of World War I and instead, studied law at the University of Prague, where in 1919 he received a doctorate. Upon the signing of the Treaty of Rapallo (1920), Rybář and his family opted to move to Ljubljana in the Kingdom of Serbs, Croats and Slovenes as opposed to staying in Italy in 1920.

== Career ==
After completing his studies, Rybář became a trainee at the Kobla Attorney's Office in Ljubljana. In November 1919, he entered the diplomatic service with his first post at the Foreign Ministry in Belgrade. He served as an expert at the Paris Peace Conference. In 1922 he became secretary of the deputies in Berlin, then deputy consul in Klagenfurt. In 1923 he became secretary of the Yugoslav mission in Paris, deputy consul in Rijeka in 1927, secretary of mission in Bucharest in 1929 and consul in Düsseldorf in 1933. In 1936 he became head of the Personal Department of the Foreign Ministry.

In December 1937, he assumed the post of counsellor at the Yugoslav diplomatic mission in Washington.

== Activities during World War II ==
During the Second World War, Rybář came into disagreement with the then Yugoslav ambassador to the United States of America, Konstantin Fotić over Fotić's position on Greater Serbia. This quarrel lead to Rybář making a request to the Yugoslav refugee government to be re posted to London. From 1944 to 1946, he assistant to the Foreign Minister of the Government of Ivan Šubašić.

While in London, Rybář begun forming close bonds with Slovene emigrant politicians, especially with Izidor Cankar. During this time, Rybář was concerned about the fate of the Slovene Littoral and in turn, prepared various proposals on this issue, and met with allied politicians in order to guarantee that the Slovene Littoral would stay within Yugoslavia. In July 1944, Rybář represented Yugoslavia at the Bretton Woods Conference. Rybář was also the Yugoslav representative at the United Nations Relief and Rehabilitation Administration.

On 15 February 1945, Vlado Šubašić left for Belgrade and left Rybář in charge of the Embassy. Rybář remained in London until 25 April in London as the handler of the Yugoslav embassy. After the arrival of the new Ambassador, Rybář became a counsellor of the Embassy and served as a deputy foreign minister in London.

== Death ==
On 22 February 1946, Rybář was appointed Extraordinary Member of Parliament and an authorized Minister of the Federal People's Republic of Yugoslavia in Norway. He arrived in Oslo from London on 2 April and handed over a letter of credit to King Haakon VII on 6 April. Rybář stayed in Norway until his sudden death on 14 November 1946. He was buried on November 28, 1946, in Belgrade.

== Honours ==
Serbian and Yugoslavian decorations
Order of St. Sava, Knight Grand Cross
Foreign Honours
Legion of Honour, Grand Cross

== Sources ==
- Enciklopedija Slovenije (1987-2002). Ljubljana: Mladinska Knjiga. 2002. ISBN 8611153677.
