= Bretton Woods Conference =

International conference in New Hampshire, US in 1944

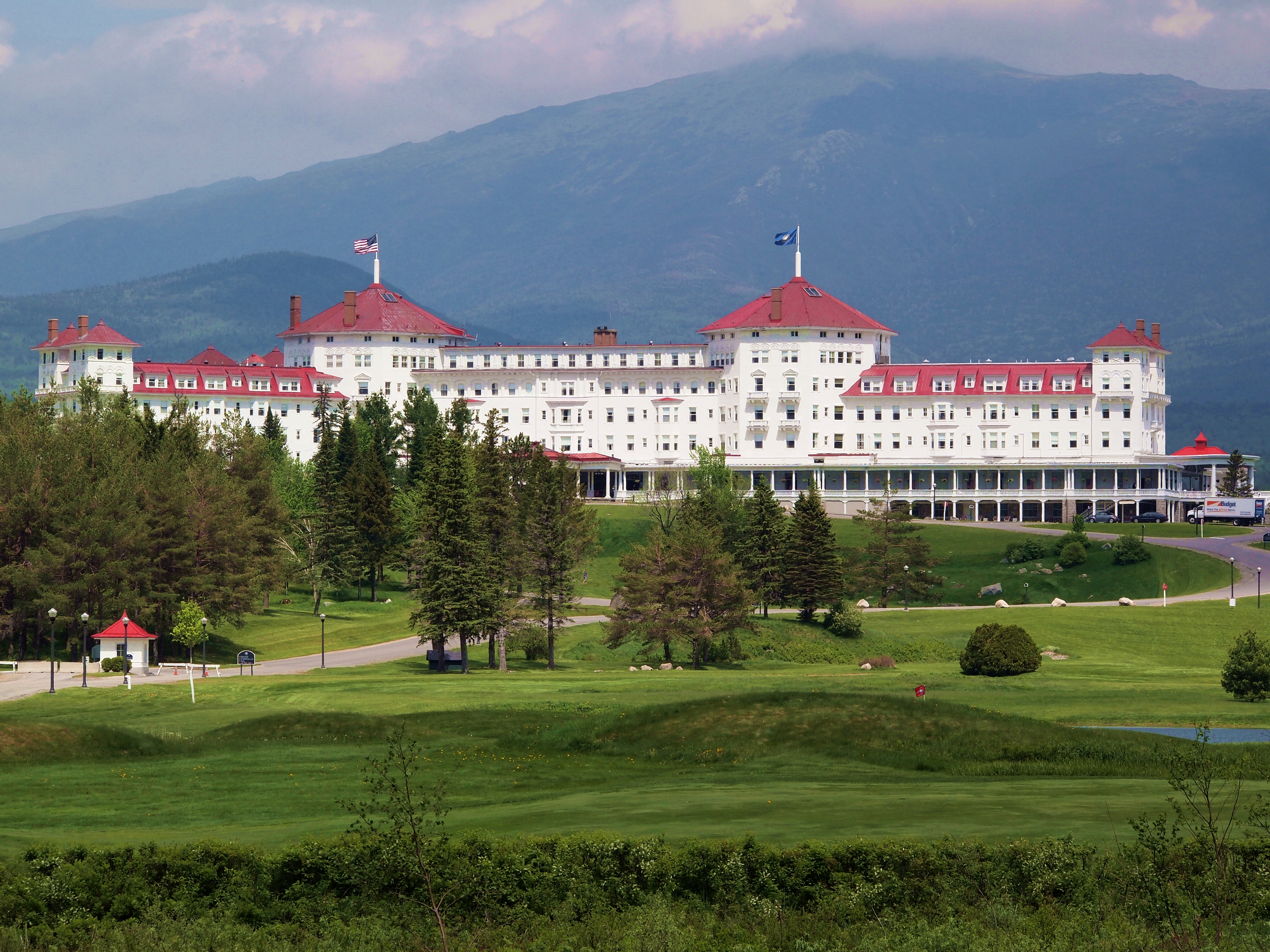
Mount Washington Hotel

The Bretton Woods Conference, formally known as the United Nations Monetary and Financial Conference, was the gathering of 730 delegates from all 44 allied nations at the Mount Washington Hotel, in Bretton Woods, New Hampshire, United States, to regulate what would be the international monetary and financial order after the conclusion of World War II.

The conference was held from July 1 to 22, 1944. Agreements were signed that, after legislative ratification by member governments, established the International Bank for Reconstruction and Development (IBRD, later part of the World Bank Group) and the International Monetary Fund (IMF). This led to what was called the Bretton Woods system for international commercial and financial relations.

== Background ==
Multilateral economic cooperation among countries was crucial for the post-war world economies. Countries sought to establish an international monetary and financial system that fostered collaboration and growth among the participating countries. They wanted to avoid the complications, faced during the interwar period, due to leaving the gold standard, the Great Depression, and trade wars that spread the depression globally. There would be a need for an entity that fostered equilibrium in exchange rates and prevented competitive devaluations while ensuring domestic policy autonomy for high employment and real income.

Additionally, countries were concerned with crisis like the one suffered by Germany in the 1920s. The Versailles treaty imposed reparations on the country for the damages it caused in World War I, and hyperinflation greatly affected the German economy. Prices rose 41 percent per day. In the autumn of 1923, 1 Dollar was worth about 4 trillion Marks, forcing the population to barter. Germany's subsequent economic turmoil led to its financial collapse and eventually to the rise of Nazism and World War II, aligning with some of John Maynard Keynes's concerns in The Economic Consequences of the Peace, published in 1919. Thus, to prevent a new crisis in the post-war world, the world economies deemed it imperative to establish a system that fostered international economic cooperation. However, the U.S. and the U.K., the most influential parties in the conference, had not decided whether such a system was in their national best interests.

Early in World War II, John Maynard Keynes of the British Treasury and Harry Dexter White of the United States Treasury Department independently began to develop ideas about the financial order of the postwar world. (See below for Keynes's proposal for an International Clearing Union.) After negotiation between officials of the United States and the United Kingdom and consultation with some other Allies, a "Joint Statement by Experts on the Establishment of an International Monetary Fund", was published simultaneously in a number of Allied countries on April 21, 1944. On May 25, 1944, the U.S. government invited the Allied countries to send representatives to an international monetary conference "for the purpose of formulating definite proposals for an International Monetary Fund and possibly a Bank for Reconstruction and Development. IBRD." (The word "International" was added to the Bank's title late in the Bretton Woods Conference.) The United States also invited a smaller group of countries to send experts to a preliminary conference in Atlantic City, New Jersey, to develop draft proposals for the Bretton Woods conference. The Atlantic City conference was held from June 15–30, 1944.

== The agreements ==
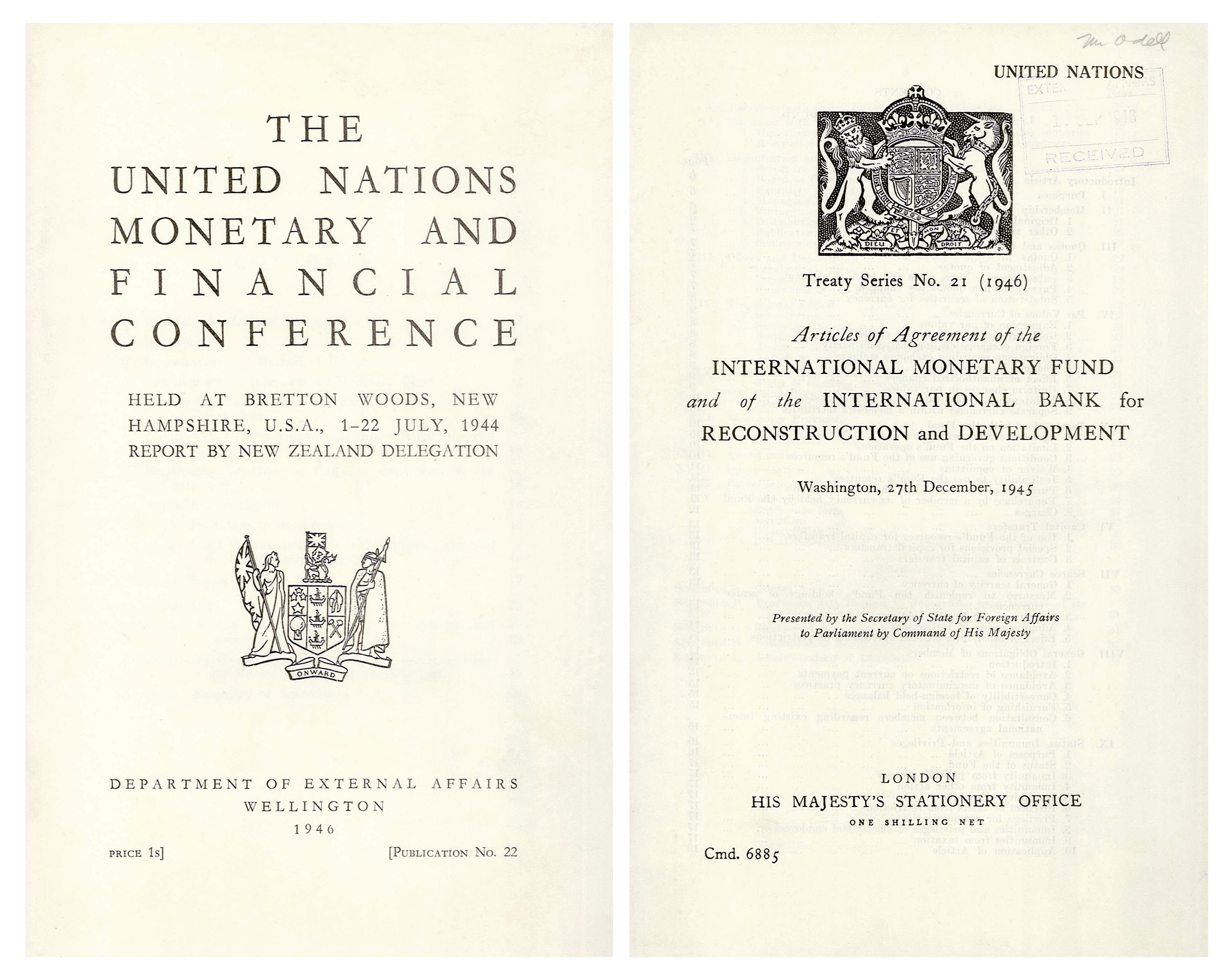
The United Nations Monetary and Financial Conference held at Bretton Woods, New Hampshire, on 1–22 July 1944

The Bretton Woods Conference had three main results:

1. Articles of Agreement to create the IMF, whose purpose was to promote stability of exchange rates and financial flows.
2. Articles of Agreement to create the IBRD, whose purpose was to speed reconstruction after the Second World War and to foster economic development, especially through lending to build infrastructure.
3. Other recommendations for international economic cooperation. The Final Act of the conference incorporated these agreements and recommendations.

Within the Final Act, the most important part in the eyes of the conference participants and for the later operation of the world economy was the IMF agreement. Its major features were:

- An adjustably pegged foreign exchange market rate system: Exchange rates were pegged to gold. Governments were only supposed to alter exchange rates to correct a "fundamental disequilibrium".
- Member countries pledged to make their currencies convertible for trade-related and other current account transactions. There were, however, transitional provisions that allowed for indefinite delay in accepting that obligation, and the IMF agreement explicitly allowed member countries to regulate capital flows. The goal of widespread current account convertibility did not become operative until December 1958, when the currencies of the IMF's Western European members and their colonies became convertible.
- As it was possible that exchange rates thus established might not be favourable to a country's balance of payments position, governments had the power to revise them by up to 10% from the initially agreed level ("par value") without objection by the IMF. The IMF could concur in or object to changes beyond that level. The IMF could not force a member to undo a change, but could deny the member access to the resources of the IMF.
- All member countries were required to subscribe to the IMF's capital. Membership in the IBRD was conditioned on being a member of the IMF. Voting in both institutions was apportioned according to formulas giving greater weight to countries contributing more capital ("quotas").

== Encouraging open markets ==
The seminal idea behind the Bretton Woods Conference was the notion of open markets. In his closing remarks at the conference, its president, U.S. Treasury Secretary Henry Morgenthau, stated that the establishment of the IMF and the IBRD marked the end of economic nationalism. This meant countries would maintain their national interest, but trade blocs and economic spheres of influence would no longer be their means. The second idea behind the Bretton Woods Conference was joint management of the Western political-economic order, meaning that the foremost industrial democratic nations must lower barriers to trade and the movement of capital, in addition to their responsibility to govern the system.

== Structure of the conference ==
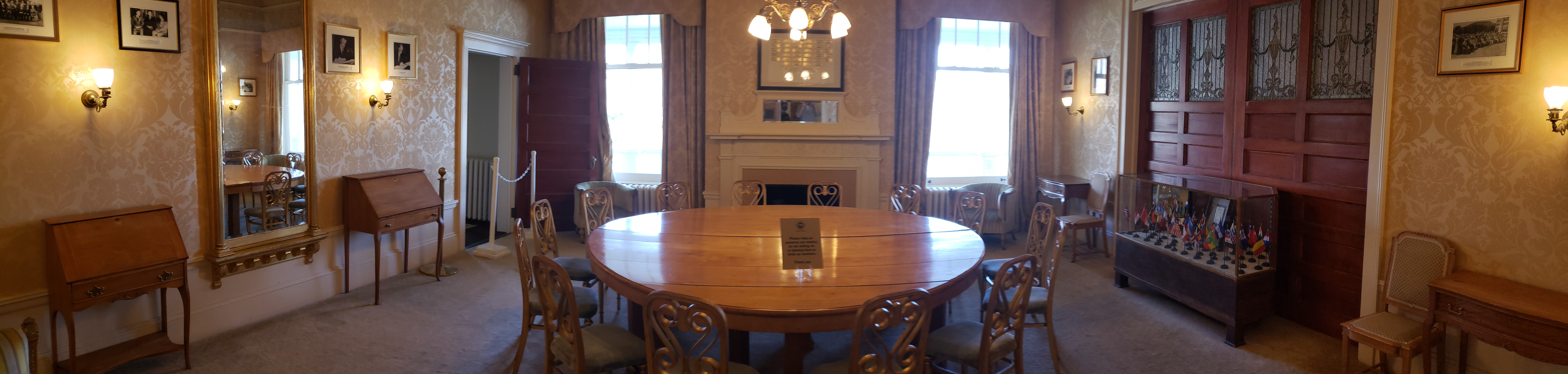
Bretton Woods Conference room

The highest body of the Bretton Woods Conference was the plenary session, which met only in the first and last days of the conference and existed mainly to confirm decisions reached by the lower bodies.

The conference conducted its major work through three "commissions". Commission I dealt with the IMF and was chaired by Harry Dexter White, Assistant to the Secretary of the U.S. Treasury and the chief American negotiator at the conference. Commission II dealt with the IBRD and was chaired by John Maynard Keynes, economic adviser to the British Chancellor of the Exchequer and the chief British negotiator at the conference. Commission III dealt with "other means of international financial cooperation" and was chaired by Eduardo Suárez, Mexico's Minister of Finance and the leader of the Mexican delegation. It was a venue for ideas that did not fall under the other two commissions.

Each commission had a number of committees, and some committees had subcommittees. Every country at the conference was entitled to send delegates to all meetings of the commissions and the "standing committees", but other committees and subcommittees had restricted membership, to allow them to work more efficiently. Except when registering final approval or disapproval of proposals, the work of the conference generally proceeded by negotiation and informal consensus rather than by formal voting. When voting occurred, each country had one vote.

The main goal of the conference was to achieve an agreement on the IMF. Enough consensus existed that the conference was also able to achieve an agreement on the IBRD. Doing so required extending the conference from its original closing date of July 19, 1944 to July 22. Because the United States was the world's largest economy at the time, and the main prospective source of funds for the IMF and IBRD, the U.S. delegation had the largest influence on the proposals agreed to at Bretton Woods.

== The Bank for International Settlements controversy ==
The Bank for International Settlements (BIS) became an object of scrutiny when the Norwegian delegation put forth evidence that the BIS was involved in war crimes.

The BIS, formed in 1930, was originally primarily intended to facilitate settling financial obligations arising from the peace treaties that concluded the First World War. During the Second World War, it helped the Germans transfer assets from occupied countries. Moreover, now that IMF was to be established, the BIS seemed to be superfluous. Commission III of the Bretton Woods Conference, therefore, considered Norway's proposal for "liquidation of the Bank for International Settlements at the earliest possible moment." The proposal passed Commission III without objection and was adopted as part of the Final Act of the conference.

Momentum for dissolving the BIS faded after U.S. President Franklin Roosevelt died in April 1945. Under his successor, Harry S. Truman, the top U.S. officials most critical of the BIS left office, and by 1948 the liquidation had been put aside.

== Monetary order in a post-war world ==
The need for post-war Western economic order was resolved with the agreements made on monetary order and open system of trade at the 1944 Bretton Woods Conference. These allowed for the synthesis of Britain's desire for full employment and economic stability and the United States' desire for free trade. The Bretton Woods system of pegged exchange rates lasted into the early 1970s.

== Failed proposals ==
=== International Trade Organization ===
The Bretton Woods Conference recommended that participating governments reach agreement to reduce obstacles to international trade. The recommendation was later embodied in the proposed International Trade Organization (ITO) to establish rules and regulations for international trade. The ITO would have complemented the IMF and IBRD. The ITO charter was agreed on at the U.N. Conference on Trade and Employment (held in Havana, Cuba, in March 1948), but the charter was not ratified by the U.S. Senate. As a result, the ITO never came into existence. The less ambitious General Agreement on Tariffs and Trade (GATT) was adopted in its place. However, in 1995, the Uruguay Round of GATT negotiations established the World Trade Organization (WTO) as the replacement body for GATT. The GATT principles and agreements were adopted by the WTO, which was charged with administering and extending them.

=== International Clearing Union ===
John Maynard Keynes first proposed the ICU in 1941, as a way to regulate the balance of trade. His concern was that countries with a trade deficit would be unable to climb out of it, paying ever more interest to service their ever-greater debt, and therefore stifling global growth. The ICU would effectively be a bank with its own currency (the "bancor"), exchangeable with national currencies at a fixed rate. It would be the unit for accounting between nations, so their trade deficits or surpluses could be measured by it.

On top of that, each country would have an overdraft facility in its "bancor" account with the ICU. Keynes proposed having a maximum overdraft of half the average trade size over five years. If a country went over that, it would be charged interest, obliging a country to reduce its currency value and prevent capital exports. But countries with trade surpluses would also be charged interest at 10% if their surplus was more than half the size of their permitted overdraft, obliging them to increase their currency values and export more capital. If at the year's end, their credit exceeded the maximum (half the size of the overdraft in surplus), the surplus would be confiscated.

Lionel Robbins reported that "it would be difficult to exaggerate the electrifying effect on thought throughout the whole relevant apparatus of government ... nothing so imaginative and so ambitious had ever been discussed". However, Harry Dexter White, representing the United States, which was the world's biggest creditor, said "We have been perfectly adamant on that point. We have taken the position of absolutely no."

Instead, White proposed an International Stabilization Fund, which would place the burden of maintaining the balance of trade on the deficit nations, and impose no limit on the surplus that rich countries could accumulate. White also proposed the creation of the IBRD (now part of the World Bank) which would provide capital for economic reconstruction after the war. The IMF as agreed to at Bretton Woods was much closer to White's proposal than to Keynes's.

== Negotiators ==
Signatory countries

State	Delegation members
Australia	Leslie Melville, Frederick Wheeler, Arthur Tange
Belgium	Camille Gutt, Georges Theunis, René Boël
Bolivia	René Ballivián Calderón
Brazil	Artur de Sousa Costa, Francisco Alves dos Santos Filho, Roberto de Oliveira Campos
Canada	James Lorimer Ilsley, Louis St Laurent, Douglas Abbott and Lionel Chevrier
Chile	Luis Álamos Barros
China, the Republic of	H. H. Kung, Tsiang Tingfu, Kuo Ping-Wen, Tsuyee Pei
Colombia	Carlos Lleras Restrepo, Miguel López Pumarejo
Costa Rica	Francisco de Paula Gutiérrez Ross
Cuba	Eduardo I. Montoulieu
Czechoslovakia	Ladislav Feierabend
Dominican Republic	Anselmo Copello
Ecuador	Esteban F. Carbo
Egypt	Sany Lackany Bey
El Salvador	Agustín Alfaro Morán
Ethiopia	Ephrem Tewelde Medhen
France	Pierre Mendès France
Greece	Kyriakos Varvaressos
Guatemala	Manuel Noriega Morales
Haiti	André Liautaud
Honduras	Julián R. Cáceres
Iceland	Magnús Sigurðsson
India (British)	Jeremy Raisman, Ardeshir Darabshaw Shroff, C. D. Deshmukh, R. K. Shanmukham Chetty
Iran	Abol Hassan Ebtehaj
Iraq	Ibrahim Kamal
Liberia	William E. Dennis Sr.
Luxembourg	Hugues Le Gallais
Mexico	Eduardo Suárez, Víctor Urquidi
Netherlands	Johan Willem Beyen
New Zealand	Walter Nash, Edward Coldham Fussell
Nicaragua	Guillermo Sevilla Sacasa
Norway	Wilhelm Keilhau
Panama	Augusto Guillermo Arango
Paraguay	Celso Ramon Velázquez
Peru	Pedro Beltrán Espantoso
(Commonwealth of the Philippines) Philippines	Andrés Soriano
Poland	Ludwik Grosfeld
(Union of South Africa) South Africa	Stefanus Frank N. Gie
Soviet Union	Mikhail Stepanovich Stepanov
United Kingdom	John Maynard Keynes
United States	Henry Morgenthau Jr., Fred Vinson, Dean Acheson, Harry Dexter White
Uruguay	Mario La Gamma Acevedo
Venezuela	Rodolfo Rojas
Yugoslavia	Vladimir Rybář

== Ratification of Bretton Woods Final Act and Savannah Conference ==
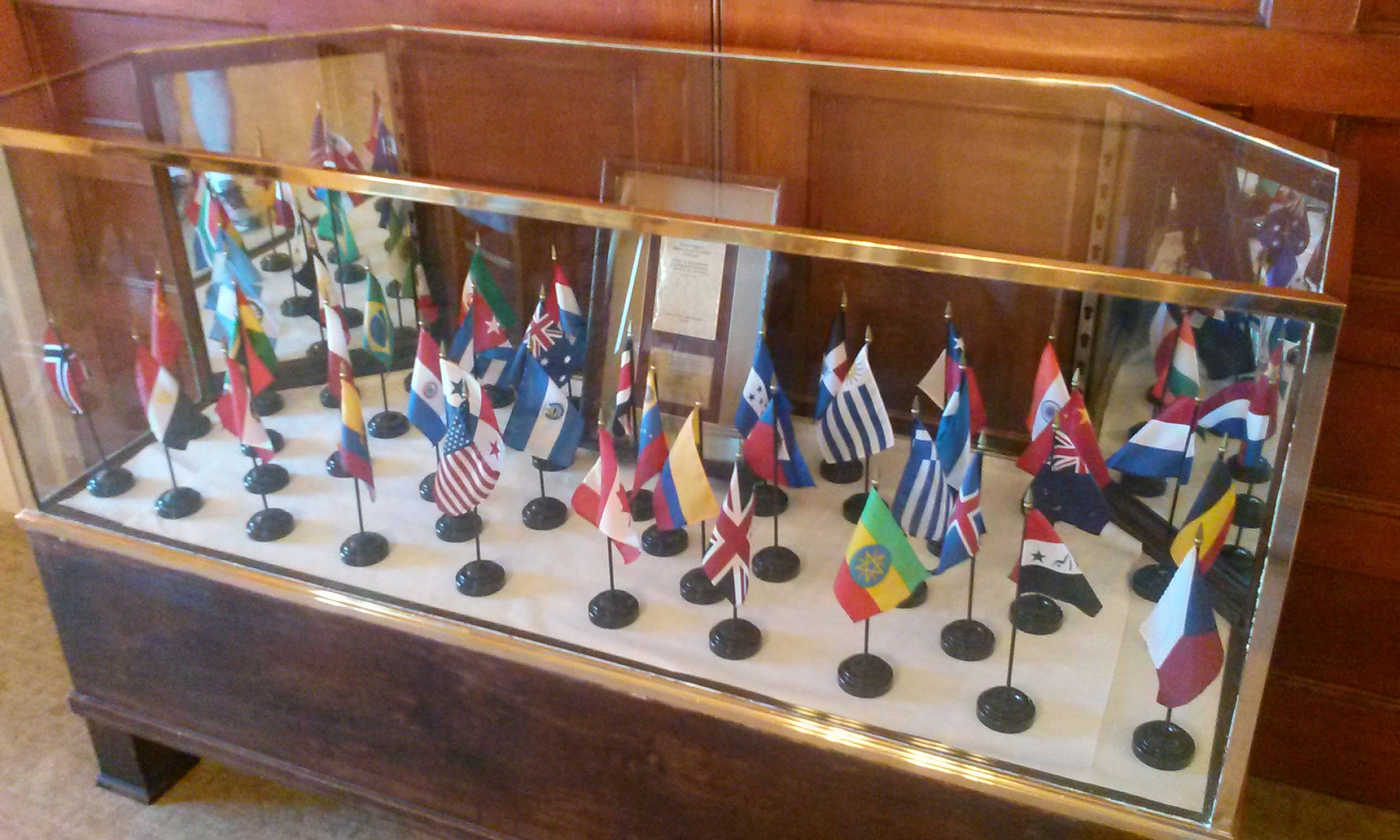
Bretton Woods Conference Participating Nations Flag Display Case located within the Gold Room at the Mount Washington Hotel. Some flags pictured are not respective of the flags used by the participants at the time.

The Articles of Agreement for the IMF and IBRD signed at Bretton Woods did not come into force until ratified by countries with at least 80 percent of the capital subscriptions ("quotas"). The threshold was reached on December 27, 1945.

The institutions were formally organized at an inaugural meeting in Savannah, Georgia, on March 8–18, 1946. Notably absent from Savannah was the USSR, which had signed the Bretton Woods Final Act but had then decided not to ratify it, rejecting the inclusion of the dollar alongside gold and citing that the institutions they had created were "branches of Wall Street". The USSR never joined the IMF and IBRD, though its successor the Russian Federation did in 1992. Australia and New Zealand were likewise absent from formal participation at Savannah (Australia sent observers), though they joined the IMF and IBRD later.

== Influence ==
At the conference, gross domestic product was adopted as the primary measure of country's economies.

Because of its success in founding two international organizations that have had long and influential lives, the Bretton Woods Conference is sometimes cited as an example worthy of imitation. In particular, since the collapse in the early 1970s of the system of pegged exchange rates agreed to at Bretton Woods there have been a number of Calls for a "New Bretton Woods".

== See also ==
- Bretton Woods system
  - Bretton Woods Committee
- Atlantic Charter, 1941 (pre UN)
- Fixed exchange rate system
- Gold standard
- International monetary systems including:
  - The Bretton Woods Era: 1945–1971
  - The post Bretton Woods system: 1971 – present
  - The "Revived Bretton Woods system" identified in 2003
  - Calls for a "New Bretton Woods"
- List of Allied World War II conferences
- Marshall Plan
- Nixon shock, 1971
- Protectionism

== Bibliography ==
- Markwell, Donald (2006). John Maynard Keynes and International Relations: Economic Paths to War and Peace. Oxford: Oxford University Press. ISBN 978-0-198-29236-4.
- Mikesell, R. F. (1994). The Bretton Woods Debates: A Memoir. Essays in International Finance 192. Princeton: International Finance Section, Dept. of Economics, Princeton University. ISBN 978-0-881-65099-0.
- Van Dormael, Armand (1978). Bretton Woods: Birth of a Monetary System. New York: Holmes & Meier. ISBN 978-0333233696.
