= Bancor =

Formerly proposed currency

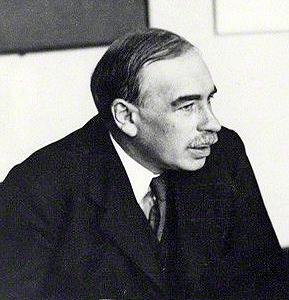
John Maynard Keynes

The bancor was a supranational currency that John Maynard Keynes and E. F. Schumacher conceptualised in the years 1940 to 1942 and which the United Kingdom proposed to introduce after World War II. The name was inspired by the French banque or ('bank gold'). This newly created supranational currency would then be used in international trade as a unit of account within a multilateral clearing system—the International Clearing Union—which would also need to be founded.

== Overview ==
John Maynard Keynes proposed an explanation for the ineffectiveness of monetary policy to stem the Great Depression, as well as a non-monetary interpretation of the depression, and finally an alternative to a monetary policy for meeting the depression. Keynes believed that in times of heavy unemployment, interest rates could not be lowered by monetary policies. The ability for capital to move between countries seeking the highest interest rate frustrated Keynesian policies. By closer government control of international trade and the movement of funds, the Keynesian policy would be more effective in stimulating individual economies.

Bancor would not be an international currency. It would rather be a unit of account used to track international flows of assets and liabilities, which would be conducted through the International Clearing Union. Gold could be exchanged for bancors, but bancors could not be exchanged for gold. Individuals could not hold or trade in bancor. All international trade would be valued and cleared in bancor. Surplus countries with excess bancor assets and deficit countries with excess bancor liabilities would both be charged to provide symmetrical incentives on them to take action to restore balanced trade. In the words of Benn Steil,

Each item a member country exported would add bancors to its ICB account, and each item it imported would subtract bancors. Limits would be imposed on the amount of bancor a country could accumulate by selling more abroad than it bought, and on the amount of bancor debt it could rack up by buying more than it sold. This was to stop countries building up excessive surpluses or deficits. Each country's limits would be proportional to its share of world trade ... Once initial limits had been breached, deficit countries would be allowed to depreciate, and surplus countries to appreciate their currencies. This would make deficit country goods cheaper, and surplus country goods more expensive, with the aim of stimulating a rebalancing of trade. Further bancor debit or credit position breaches would trigger mandatory action. For chronic debtors, this would include obligatory currency depreciation, rising interest payments to the ICB Reserve Fund, forced gold sales, and capital export restrictions. For chronic creditors, it would include currency appreciation and payment of a minimum of 5 percent interest on excess credits, rising to 10 percent on larger excess credits, to the ICB's Reserve Fund. Keynes never believed that creditors would actually pay what in effect were fines; rather, he believed they would take the necessary actions ... to avoid them.

== Bretton Woods Conference ==
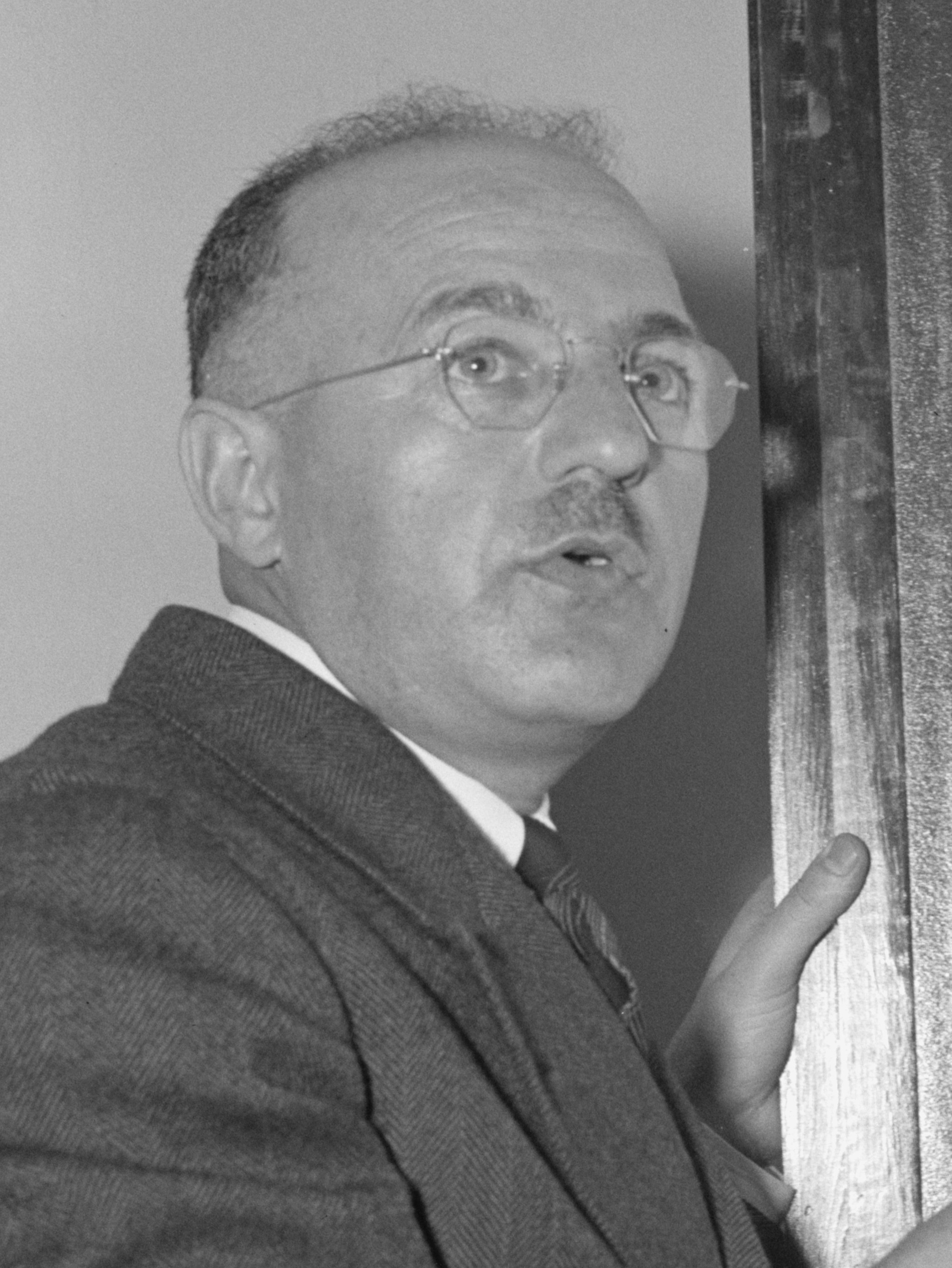
Harry D. White, Director of Monetary Research for the U.S. Treasury

Keynes's proposal became the United Kingdom's official proposal at the Bretton Woods Conference, but it was not accepted.

== Proposed revival ==
Since the 2008 financial crisis, Keynes's proposal has been revived. Its proponents have argued that since the end of the Bretton Woods system when the United States dollar was unpegged from gold, the United States was incentivized to run high government spending and high deficits, which made the global financial system unstable. In a speech delivered in March 2009 entitled Reform the International Monetary System, Zhou Xiaochuan, the Governor of the People's Bank of China called Keynes's bancor approach "farsighted" and proposed the adoption of International Monetary Fund (IMF) special drawing rights (SDRs) as a global reserve currency as a response to the 2008 financial crisis. U.S. Secretary of the Treasury Timothy Geithner expressed interest in the idea of greater use of SDRs as a reserve. However, he was criticized severely for this in the United States, and the dollar lost 5 cents against the euro in exchange markets following his statements. He and President Barack Obama shortly afterwards backtracked Geithner's comments.

He argued that a national currency was unsuitable as a global reserve currency because of the Triffin dilemma—the difficulty faced by reserve currency issuers in trying to simultaneously achieve their domestic monetary policy goals and meet other countries' demand for reserve currency. A similar analysis can be found in the report of the United Nations' "Experts on reforms of the international monetary and financial system" as well as in the IMF's study published on 13 April 2010.

== See also ==
- Spesmilo
- Triffin dilemma
