= Special drawing rights =

Supplementary foreign exchange reserve assets defined and maintained by the IMF

ISO 4217
- Code: XDR (numeric: 960)

Units of account
- Symbol: SDR

Demographics
- Date of introduction: 1969
- User(s): IMF

Valuation
- Pegged with: U.S. dollar, euro, Japanese yen, pound sterling and Chinese yuan
- Pegged by: Arab Accounting Dinar (AAD) = 3 SDRs

Special drawing rights (SDRs, code XDR) are a supplementary foreign exchange reserve asset defined and maintained by the International Monetary Fund (IMF). SDRs are the units of account for the IMF, and not a currency; rather, SDR value is based on a basket of currencies, the specific composition of which is reviewed every five years. SDRs represent a claim to currency held by IMF member countries for which they may be exchanged. When SDRs were created in 1969, they were each worth 0.888671 grams of gold, roughly the equivalent of one US dollar at the time. In 1974, the IMF redefined the SDR as equivalent to the value of a specific selection of world currencies.

SDRs are allocated by the IMF to IMF member countries and central banks, and cannot be held or used by private entities or individuals. The number of SDRs in existence was around XDR 21.4 billion in August 2009. During the 2008 financial crisis, an additional XDR 182.6 billion was allocated to "provide liquidity to the global economic system and supplement member countries' official reserves". By October 2014, the number of SDRs in existence was XDR 204 billion. Due to economic stress caused by the response to the COVID-19 pandemic, several finance ministers of poorer countries called for a new allocation to support member economies as they seek ways to recover, and some economists called for the allocation to be as high as $4T. In March 2021, the G24 and others proposed an allocation of $500B for this purpose. In response, XDR 456.5 billion (about US$650B) was allocated on 23 August 2021.

The value of a SDR is based on a basket of key international currencies reviewed by IMF every five years. The weights assigned to the currencies in the XDR basket are adjusted to take into account their current prominence in terms of international trade and national foreign exchange reserves. As of August 2023, the XDR basket consists of the following five currencies: U.S. dollar 43.38%, euro 29.31%, Chinese yuan 12.28%, Japanese yen 7.59%, British pound sterling 7.44%.

== Name ==
While the ISO 4217 currency code for special drawing rights is XDR (and the numeric code is 960), they are often referred to by their acronym SDR. The name was chosen as a compromise between parties who wanted an international currency and those who wanted a credit facility. Member countries receiving XDR allocations were required by the reconstitution provision of the XDR articles to hold a prescribed number of XDRs. If a state used any of its allotment, it was expected to rebuild its XDR holdings. As the reconstitution provisions were abrogated in 1981, the XDR now functions less like credit than it did previously. Countries are still expected to maintain their XDR holdings at a certain level, but penalties for holding fewer than the allocated amount are now less onerous.

The name may actually derive from an early proposal for IMF "reserve drawing rights". The word "reserve" was later replaced with "special" because the idea that the IMF was creating a foreign exchange reserve asset was contentious.

== History ==
Special drawing rights were created by the IMF in 1969 and were intended to be an asset held in foreign exchange reserves under the Bretton Woods system of fixed exchange rates. After the collapse of that system in the early 1970s, the XDR has taken on a less important role. Acting as the unit of account for the IMF has been its primary purpose since 1972.

The IMF itself calls the current role of the XDR "insignificant". Developed countries, who hold the greatest number of XDRs, are unlikely to use them for any purpose. The only actual users of XDRs may be those developing countries that see them as "a rather cheap line of credit".

One reason XDRs may not see much use as foreign exchange reserve assets is that they must be exchanged into a currency before use. This is due in part to the fact private parties do not hold XDRs: they are only used and held by IMF member countries, the IMF itself, and a select few organizations licensed to do so by the IMF. Basic functions of foreign exchange reserves, such as market intervention and liquidity provision, as well as some less prosaic ones, such as maintaining export competitiveness via favorable exchange rates, cannot be accomplished directly using XDRs. This fact has led the IMF to label the XDR as an "imperfect reserve asset".

Another reason they may see little use is that the number of XDRs in existence is relatively few compared to the total amount of foreign exchange reserves. To function well a foreign exchange reserve asset must have sufficient liquidity, but XDRs, because of their small number, may be perceived to be an illiquid asset. The IMF says, "expanding the volume of official XDRs is a prerequisite for them to play a more meaningful role as a substitute reserve asset."

=== Alternative to U.S. dollar ===
The XDR comes to prominence when the U.S. dollar is weak or otherwise unsuitable to be a foreign exchange reserve asset. This usually manifests itself as an allocation of XDRs to IMF member countries. Distrust of the U.S. dollar is not the only stated reason for allocations to have been made, however. One of its first roles was to alleviate an expected shortfall of U.S. dollars c. 1970. Back then, the United States followed a more conservative monetary policy. If the United States had continued down this path, the dollar would have become a less attractive foreign exchange reserve asset: it would not have had the necessary liquidity to serve this function. Soon after XDR allocations began, the United States reversed its former policy and provided sufficient liquidity. In the process a potential role for the XDR was removed. During this first round of allocations, 9.3 billion XDRs were distributed to IMF member countries.

The XDR resurfaced in 1978 when many countries were wary of taking on more foreign exchange reserve assets denominated in U.S. dollars. This suspicion of the dollar precipitated an allocation of 12 billion XDRs over a period of four years.

Concomitant with the 2008 financial crisis, the third round of XDR allocations occurred in the years 2009 and 2011. The IMF recognized the financial crisis as the cause for distributing the large majority of these third-round allotments, but some allocations were couched as distributing XDRs to countries that had never received any and others as a re-balancing of IMF quotas, which determine how many XDRs a country is allotted, to better represent the economic strength of emerging markets.

During this time China, a country with large holdings of U.S. dollar foreign exchange reserves, voiced its displeasure at the current international monetary system, and promoted measures that would allow the XDR to "fully satisfy the member countries' demand for a reserve currency." These comments, made by a chairman of the People's Bank of China, Zhou Xiaochuan, drew media attention, and the IMF showed some support for China's stance. It produced a paper exploring ways the substance and function of the XDR could be increased. China has also suggested the creation of a substitution account to allow exchange of U.S. dollars into XDRs. When substitution was proposed before, in 1978, the United States appeared reluctant to allow such a mechanism to become operational.

=== Use by developing countries ===
In 2001, the UN suggested allocating XDRs to developing countries for use by them as cost-free alternatives to building foreign exchange reserves through borrowing or running current account surpluses. In 2009, an XDR allocation was made to countries that had joined the IMF after the 1979–1981 round of allocations was complete (and so had never been allocated any). First proposed in 1997, many of the beneficiaries of this 2009 allocation were developing countries. (Note: Countries that joined the IMF post-1981 include: Albania (1991), Angola (1989), Antigua and Barbuda (1982), Armenia (1992), Azerbaijan (1992), Belarus (1992), Belize (1982), Bosnia and Herzegovina (1992), Brunei Darussalam (1995), Bulgaria (1990), Croatia (1992), Czech Republic (1993), Eritrea (1994), Estonia (1992), Georgia (1992), Hungary (1982), Kazakhstan (1992), Kiribati (1986), Kosovo (2009), Kyrgyz Republic (1992), Latvia (1992), Lithuania (1992), Macedonia (1992), Marshall Islands (1992), Micronesia (1993), Moldova (1992), Mongolia (1991), Montenegro (2007), Mozambique (1984), Namibia (1990), Palau (1997), Poland (1986), Russia (1992), San Marino (1992), Serbia (1992), St. Kitts and Nevis (1984), Tajikistan (1993), Timor-Leste (2002), Tonga (1985), Turkmenistan (1992), Tuvalu (2010–as Tuvalu joined after the 2009 special allocation, it may not have received XDRs), Ukraine (1992), Uzbekistan (1992), and Yemen (1990).)

=== COVID-19 pandemic ===
On 23 August 2021, the IMF allocated $650 billion worth of XDRs to all 190 members of the IMF in proportion to member quotas in response to COVID-19 related balance of payments concerns. This allocation of XDRs represents roughly two-thirds of all XDRs currently in circulation, and was by far the largest ever single allocation of XDRs.

== Value definition ==
=== Currency basket ===
To determine the composition of the XDR, the IMF takes into account several currencies important to the world's trading and financial systems. A currency's importance is currently measured by two factors: the amount of exports sold in that currency, and whether that currency is considered "freely usable" (determined by its use as a foreign exchange reserve asset and how widely it is used in international transactions).

An XDR basket definition remains valid for five years. Approximately one to two months before the end of this time period, the IMF Executive Board re-evaluates the XDR basket; the currencies included as well as their weights can then change. Changing the XDR's value definition requires at least 70% of the votes among the IMF members. The changes take effect at the end of the five-year period. One business day before taking effect, the newly defined weights are converted to currency amounts based on an average of the exchange rate over the past three months, such that the value of the XDR in U.S. dollars remains the same before and after the change. The currency amounts then remain fixed throughout the five-year period.

The IMF reserves the right to perform a re-evaluation after less than five years if it decides that the current basket no longer reflects "the relative importance of currencies in the world’s trading and financial systems"; it also reserves the right to postpone re-evaluations. If either occurs (causing the old definition to be valid for less or more than five years), the new definition will still be valid for a full five years.

=== Historical valuation ===
At the time of the XDR's creation in 1969, the United States dollar was backed by the gold standard and the XDR was fixed at 1/35 troy ounce (0.889 g; 13.7 gr) of gold or exactly 1 US dollar. After the Nixon Shock of 1971 and during the collapse of the Bretton Woods system between 1971 and 1973, the XDR initially remained fixed relative to the nominal international price of gold, even after the value of the United States dollar dropped to $38 per troy ounce in 1972 and to $42 2/9 per troy ounce in 1973. On 1 July 1974, the XDR instead became defined by a currency basket of 16 currencies.

On 1 January 1981, the five-year schedule was introduced and the XDR basket was reduced to five currencies: the United States dollar, the Deutsche mark, the French franc, the British pound, and the Japanese yen. When the euro was introduced in January 1999, it replaced the German mark and French franc and the basket consisted of four currencies.

In November 2010, the IMF determined that China's renminbi met the export requirement but failed to meet the "freely usable" requirement and thus was not included in the XDR basket taking effect on 1 January 2011. In November 2015, the IMF announced that the renminbi now met the "freely usable" requirement and would be included in the next basket definition, changing its size back to five currencies. The effective date of the re-evaluation was postponed to 1 October 2016, in order to "allow users sufficient lead time to adjust". In 2016, the renminbi was added to the basket with a 10.9% weighting.

In March 2021, the IMF announced that the next re-evaluation, normally scheduled for 1 October 2021, would be postponed to 1 August 2022, in order to prevent the basket's definition from changing during the COVID-19 pandemic.

Value of 1 XDR (Note: Relative compositions expressed in per cent are rounded.)
Period	(United States) USD															
1969–1971	1.0 (100%)															
	XAU															
1971–1974	1/35 (100%)															
	(United States) USD	(Germany) DEM	(United Kingdom) GBP	(France) FRF	(Italy) ITL	(Japan) JPY	(Canada) CAD	(Netherlands) NLG	(Belgium) BEF	(Saudi Arabia) SAR	(Spain) ESP	(Australia) AUD	(Sweden) SEK	(Iran) IRR	(Norway) NOK	(Austria) ATS
1974–1980	0.4 (32.6%)	0.32 (10.2%)	0.05 (9.7%)	0.42 (7.1%)	52.0 (6.6%)	21.0 (6.0%)	0.07 (5.9%)	0.14 (4.3%)	1.6 (3.5%)	0.13 (3.0%)	1.5 (2.1%)	0.017 (2.1%)	0.11 (2.1%)	1.7 (2.0%)	0.1 (1.5%)	0.28 (1.3%)

	(United States) USD	(Germany) DEM	(France) FRF	(Japan) JPY	(United Kingdom) GBP
1981–1985	0.54 (42%)	0.46 (19%)	0.74 (13%)	34.0 (13%)	0.071 (13%)
1986–1990	0.452 (42%)	0.527 (19%)	1.02 (12%)	33.4 (15%)	0.0893 (12%)
1991–1995	0.572 (40%)	0.453 (21%)	0.8 (11%)	31.8 (17%)	0.0812 (11%)
1996–1998	0.582 (39%)	0.446 (21%)	0.813 (11%)	27.2 (18%)	0.105 (11%)

	(United States) USD	(Europe) EUR	(Japan) JPY	(United Kingdom) GBP
1999–2000	0.582 (39%)	0.3519 (32%)	27.2 (18%)	0.105 (11%)
2001–2005	0.577 (44%)	0.426 (31%)	21.0 (14%)	0.0984 (11%)
2006–2010	0.632 (44%)	0.41 (34%)	18.4 (11%)	0.0903 (11%)
2011–2016	0.66 (41.9%)	0.423 (37.4%)	12.1 (9.4%)	0.111 (11.3%)

	(United States) USD	(Europe) EUR	(China) CNY	(Japan) JPY	(United Kingdom) GBP
2016–2022	0.58252 (41.73%)	0.38671 (30.93%)	1.0174 (10.92%)	11.9 (8.33%)	0.085946 (8.09%)
2022–2027	0.57813 (43.38%)	0.37379 (29.31%)	1.0993 (12.28%)	13.452 (7.59%)	0.080870 (7.44%)

=== Daily valuation ===
Because of fluctuating exchange rates, the relative value of each currency varies continuously, as does the value of the XDR. The IMF sets the value of the XDR in terms of United States dollars every day. The latest United States dollar valuation of the XDR is published on the IMF website. For example, on 31 January 2021, the value was USD1.44080, and on 22 June 2021, the value was USD1.426480.

== Allocations ==
XDRs are allocated to member countries by the IMF. A country's IMF quota, the maximum amount of financial resources that it is obligated to contribute to the fund, determines its allotment of XDRs. Creating a new allocation requires 85% of the votes in the SDR Department of the IMF. All IMF member countries are represented in the SDR Department, but this is not a one country, one vote system; voting power is determined by a member country's IMF quota. For example, the United States has 16.7% of the vote as of 2 March 2011. This means the United States has a de facto veto on all new XDR allocations, it is currently the only country that does.

Allocations are not made on a regular basis and have only occurred on rare occasions. The first round took place because of a situation that was soon reversed, the possibility of an insufficient amount of U.S. dollars because of U.S. reluctance to run the deficit necessary to supply future demand. Extraordinary circumstances have, likewise, led to the other XDR allocation events. For example, during the 2008 financial crisis, XDR 182.6 billion was allocated to "provide liquidity to the global economic system and supplement member countries’ official reserves". The 2011 allocations were to low-income member countries. The 2021 allocation was in the aftermath of the COVID19 pandemic.

Date	Allocations (XDR billions)
1969 – 1970	3.4
1971	6.4
1972 – 1978	9.3
1979	13.3
1980	17.4
1981 – 2008	21.4
2009 – 2020	204.0
2021 –	660.7

After being split among the IMF member countries, the 2021 allocation gave Liberia and South Sudan each an amount equal to 9-10% of their GDP. (Note: The citation uses the earlier-proposed $500B allocation amount, while the actual allocation was worth $650B.)

== Exchange ==
An IMF member country that requires actual foreign currency may sell its XDRs to another member country in exchange for the currency. To sell a part or all its XDRs, the country must find a willing party to buy them. The IMF acts as an intermediary in this voluntary exchange.

The IMF also has the authority under the designation mechanism to ask member countries with strong foreign exchange reserves to purchase XDRs from those with weak reserves. The maximum obligation any country has under this mechanism is currently equal to twice the amount of its XDR allocation. As of 2023, XDRs may only be exchanged for euros, Japanese yen, UK pounds, US dollars or Chinese yuan. The IMF says exchanging XDRs can take "several days".

It is not, however, the IMF that pays out foreign currency in exchange for XDRs: the claim to currency that XDRs represent is not a claim on the IMF.

The percentage of foreign exchange reserves in XDRs increases sharply after a new allocation, then declines until the next allocation. In the early 1970s, the percentage of non-gold reserves in XDRs reached a peak of 8.4%. In January 2011, this amount was less than 4%. In April 2020, prior to the large allocation regarding the COVID-19 pandemic, this amount was under 3%; by comparison, over half (of non-gold reserves) were in the United States dollar.

== Interest rate ==
The IMF calculates a weekly interest rate, which is based on "a weighted average of representative interest rates on short-term debt in the money markets of the XDR basket currencies". No interest is payable on the XDRs allocated to a country by the IMF. However, interest is payable by an IMF member country that has exchanged (sold) some or all of the XDRs it was allocated, and interest is paid to a member country that holds more XDRs than it was allocated (i.e., the country that bought XDRs from another member). In April 2020, the interest rate was 0.05%.

== Other uses ==
The XDR is used in international transactions, including export quotas in the IMF members and the number of official reserve assets which were in their own currencies. It is traded on the main foreign exchange market, including foreign exchange trading volume, whether there are forward exchange markets.

=== Unit of account ===
Some international organizations use the XDR as a unit of account. The IMF says using the XDR in this way "help[s] cope with exchange rate volatility." As of 2001, organizations that use the XDR as a unit of account, besides the IMF itself, include: Universal Postal Union, African Development Bank, Arab Monetary Fund, Asian Development Bank, Bank for International Settlements, Common Fund for Commodities, East African Development Bank, Economic Community of West African States, International Center for Settlement of Investment Disputes, International Fund for Agricultural Development, and Islamic Development Bank. It is not only international organizations that use the XDR in this way. JETRO uses XDRs to price foreign aid. In addition, charges, liabilities, and fees prescribed by some international treaties are denominated in XDRs. In 2003, the Bank for International Settlements ceased to use the gold franc as their currency, in favour of XDR.

Some bonds are also denominated in XDR, like the IBRD 2016 XDR denominated bonds.

=== Use in international law ===
In some international treaties and agreements, XDRs are used to value penalties, charges or prices. For example, the Convention on Limitation of Liability for Maritime Claims caps personal liability for damages to ships at XDR 330,000. The Montreal Convention and other treaties also use XDRs in this way, capping damages at XDR 128,821.

=== Use as currency ===
According to the IMF, "the SDR may not be any country’s optimal basket", but a few countries do peg their currencies to the XDR. One possible benefit to nations with XDR pegs is that they may be perceived to be more transparent. As of 2000, the number of countries that did so was four. This is a substantial decrease from 1983, when 14 countries had XDR pegs. Between 1981 and 2002, the Iranian rial was pegged to the XDR. As of 2010, Syria pegs its pound to the XDR.

== See also ==
- Bancor
- Reserve currency
- Group of Ten (IMF)
- Central securities depository
