= Nixon shock =

1971 decoupling of the US dollar from gold

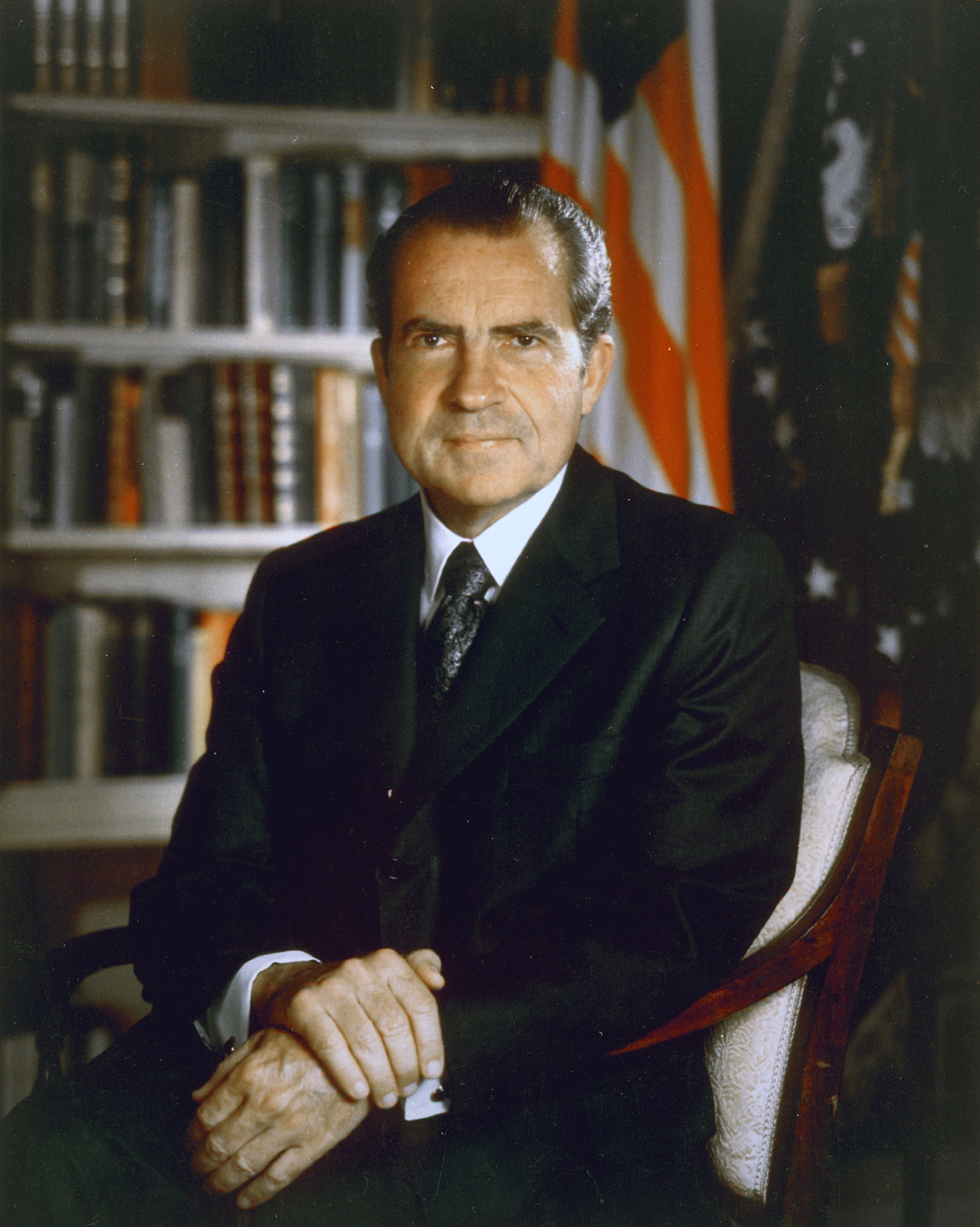
- Richard Nixon in 1971
- Date: August 15, 1971; 55 years ago
- Venue: White House
- Also known as: End of the Bretton Woods Agreement
- Type: Speech
- Theme: Economic
- Outcome: Floating exchange rates for major currencies, end of gold convertibility for the U.S. dollar
- Footage: https://www.youtube.com/watch?v=0BVj2gT6CgI

The Nixon shock was the effect of a series of economic measures, including wage and price freezes, surcharges on imports, and the unilateral cancellation of the direct international convertibility of the United States dollar to gold, taken by United States president Richard Nixon on August 15, 1971, in response to increasing inflation and threats of a currency crisis.

Although Nixon's actions did not formally abolish the existing Bretton Woods system of international financial exchange, the suspension of one of its key components effectively rendered the Bretton Woods system inoperative. While Nixon publicly stated his intention to resume direct convertibility of the dollar after reforms to the Bretton Woods system had been implemented, all attempts at reform proved unsuccessful, effectively converting the U.S. dollar into a fiat currency. By 1973, the floating exchange rate regime de facto replaced the Bretton Woods system for other global currencies.

== Background ==
=== Bretton Woods system ===
In 1944, representatives from 44 nations met in Bretton Woods, New Hampshire, to develop a new international monetary system that came to be known as the Bretton Woods system. Conference attendees had hoped that this new system would "ensure exchange rate stability, prevent competitive devaluations, and promote economic growth". The Bretton Woods system became fully operational by 1958. Under the system, countries settled their international accounts in United States dollars, which could be converted to gold at a fixed exchange rate of $35 per ounce, which was redeemable by the U.S. government. Thus, the United States was committed to backing every U.S. dollar overseas with gold, and other currencies were pegged to the dollar.

For the first years after World War II, the Bretton Woods system worked well. Under the Marshall Plan, Japan and Europe were rebuilding from the war, and demand for American goods and dollars were high, and because the U.S. owned over half the world's official gold reserves—574 million ounces at the end of World War II—the system appeared secure.

However, as Germany and Japan recovered from 1950 to 1969, the U.S. share of global economic output dropped from 35% to 27%. Furthermore, a negative balance of payments, growing public debt incurred to fund U.S. involvement in the Vietnam War, and monetary inflation by the Federal Reserve caused the dollar to become increasingly overvalued in the 1960s.

==== Criticism and decline ====
In France, Minister of Finance Valéry Giscard d'Estaing criticized the Bretton Woods system as "America's exorbitant privilege", as it permitted the United States to avoid a currency crisis and resulted, in the words of American economist Barry Eichengreen, in an "asymmetric financial system" where non-U.S. citizens "see themselves supporting American living standards and subsidizing American multinationals."

"It costs only a few cents for the Bureau of Engraving and Printing to produce a $100 bill, but other countries had to pony up $100 of actual goods in order to obtain one."

— Barry Eichengreen, Exorbitant Privilege: The Rise and Fall of the Dollar and the Future of the International Monetary System (2011)

In February 1965, French president Charles de Gaulle announced his intention to redeem U.S. dollar reserves for gold at the official exchange rate. By 1966, non-U.S. central banks held $14 billion in U.S. dollars, while the United States had only $13.2 billion in gold reserves, of which only $3.2 billion was available to cover foreign holdings.

In March 1968, the London Gold Pool collapsed.

In May 1971, West Germany left the Bretton Woods system, unwilling to sell further Deutschmarks for U.S. dollars. In the following three months, the U.S. dollar dropped 7.5% against the Deutschmark, and other nations began to demand redemption of their U.S. dollars for gold. On August 5, 1971, the United States Congress released a report recommending devaluation of the dollar in an effort to protect their currency against "foreign price-gougers". Also in August, French president Georges Pompidou sent a ship to New York City to retrieve French gold deposits.

On August 9, 1971, as the dollar dropped in value against European currencies, Switzerland left the Bretton Woods system. Pressure intensified on the United States to leave the Bretton Woods system. On August 11, Britain requested $3 billion in gold be moved from Fort Knox to the Federal Reserve in New York. As Paul Volcker, then Undersecretary of the United States Department of the Treasury for Monetary Affairs, later put it:

"If the British, who had founded the system with us, and who had fought so hard to defend their own currency, were going to take gold for their dollars, it was clear the game was indeed over."

— Paul Volcker, Changing Fortunes: The World's Money and the Threat to American Leadership (1992)

By August 15, there were only 10,000 metric tonnes (= 352740000 ounces) of gold remaining in the U.S. reserves, less than half of their peak amount. At the time, the U.S. also had a monthly unemployment rate of 6.1%, as well as an annual inflation rate of 5.84%.

== American policy response ==
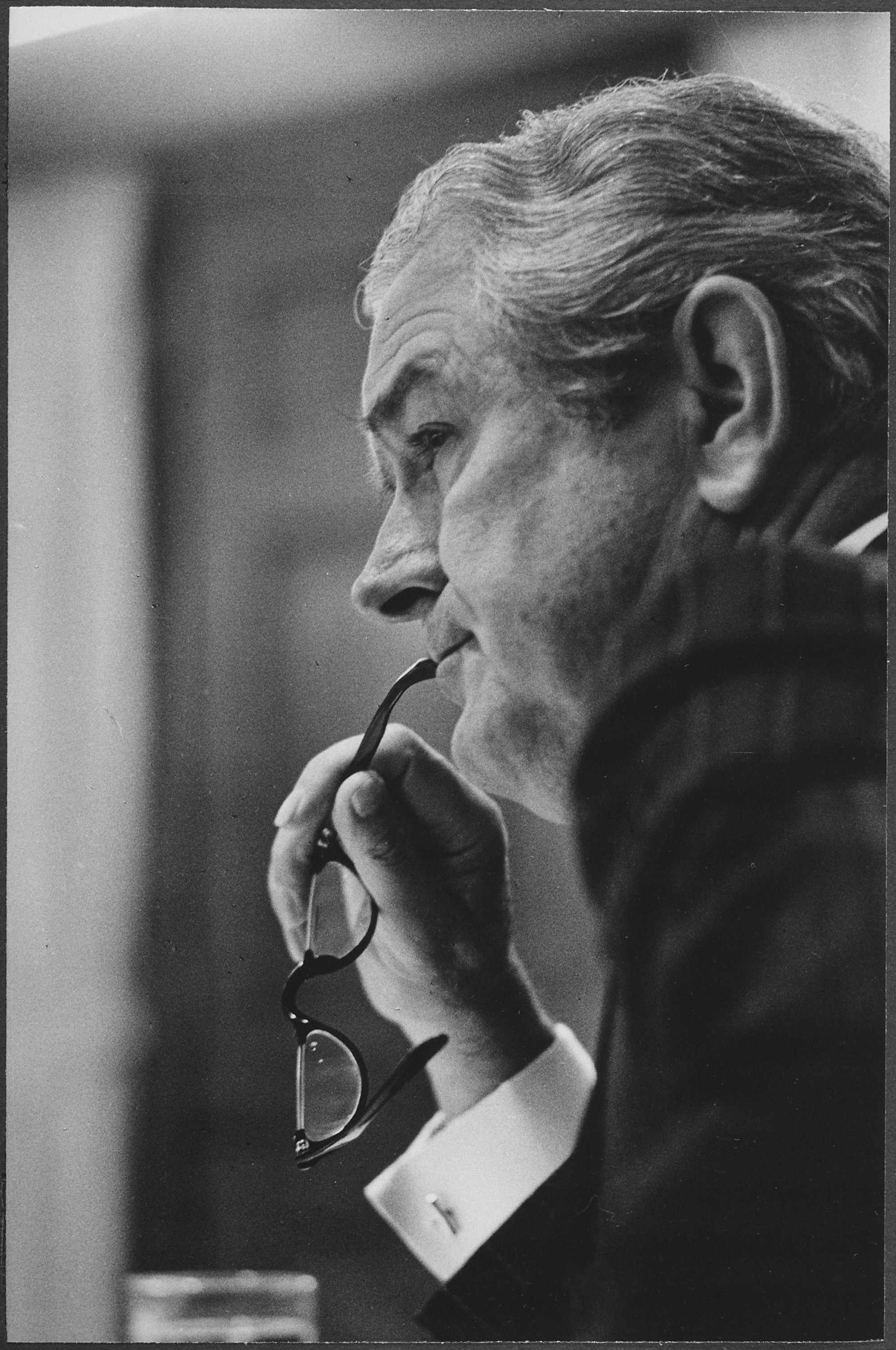
U.S. Treasury Secretary John Connally, photographed on the day Nixon's policies were announced, was the primary political force behind them.

To combat these problems, Nixon consulted Federal Reserve chairman Arthur F. Burns, Treasury Secretary John Connally, and Paul Volcker. On the afternoon of Friday, August 13, 1971, Nixon, Burns, Connally, Volcker, and twelve other high-ranking White House and Treasury advisors met secretly at Camp David to discuss policy solutions to the growing crisis. Nixon, relying heavily on the advice of Connally, ultimately decided to abandon the Bretton Woods system by announcing the following actions on August 15:

1. Nixon directed Connally to suspend the convertibility of the dollar into gold or other reserve assets (with certain exceptions), such that foreign governments could no longer exchange their dollars for gold, thereby ending the Bretton Woods system.
2. Nixon issued Executive Order 11615 (pursuant to the Economic Stabilization Act of 1970), imposing a 90-day freeze on wages and prices.
3. Nixon instituted a 10 percent import surcharge in anticipation of the expected fluctuation in exchange rates.

On Sunday, August 15, when American financial markets were closed, Nixon explained the policy agenda in a national address:

We must protect the position of the American dollar as a pillar of monetary stability around the world. In the past 7 years, there has been an average of one international monetary crisis every year...

Let me lay to rest the bugaboo of what is called devaluation. If you want to buy a foreign car or take a trip abroad, market conditions may cause your dollar to buy slightly less. But if you are among the overwhelming majority of Americans who buy American-made products in America, your dollar will be worth just as much tomorrow as it is today.

The effect of this action, in other words, will be to stabilize the dollar. — Richard Nixon, Address to the Nation Outlining a New Economic Policy: "The Challenge of Peace", The American Presidency Project

This was the first time the U.S. government had enacted wage and price controls since the Korean War.

== Impact and aftermath ==
The Nixon shock has been widely considered to be a political success but an economic failure for bringing on the 1973–1975 recession, the stagflation of the 1970s, and the instability of floating currencies.

=== Domestic political effect in the United States ===
Politically, Nixon's actions were a great success. The American public believed the government was rescuing them from price gougers and an exchange crisis which they blamed on foreign powers. The Dow Jones Industrial Average rose 33 points on August 16, its largest daily gain ever at that point, and The New York Times editorial read, "We unhesitatingly applaud the boldness with which the President has moved."

Nixon was re-elected president in 1972 by a historic landslide margin over George McGovern.

=== Immediate impacts ===
Following Nixon's announcement, the Bank of Japan (BOJ) intervened significantly in the foreign exchange market to prevent the yen from appreciating. On August 16–17, 1971, the BOJ had to buy $1.3 billion to support the U.S. dollar and maintain the yen at the old rate of 360 JPY/USD. As a result of its fixed exchange rate policy, Japan's foreign exchange reserves rapidly increased to $2.7 billion a week later and $4 billion the following week. Nevertheless, the large-scale BOJ intervention could not prevent the depreciation of the U.S. dollar against the yen. France also was willing to allow the dollar to depreciate against the franc but not allow the franc to appreciate against gold.

Following the suspension of convertibility, the price of gold per troy ounce in U.S. dollars sharply increased.

=== Smithsonian Agreement and floating exchange rate ===
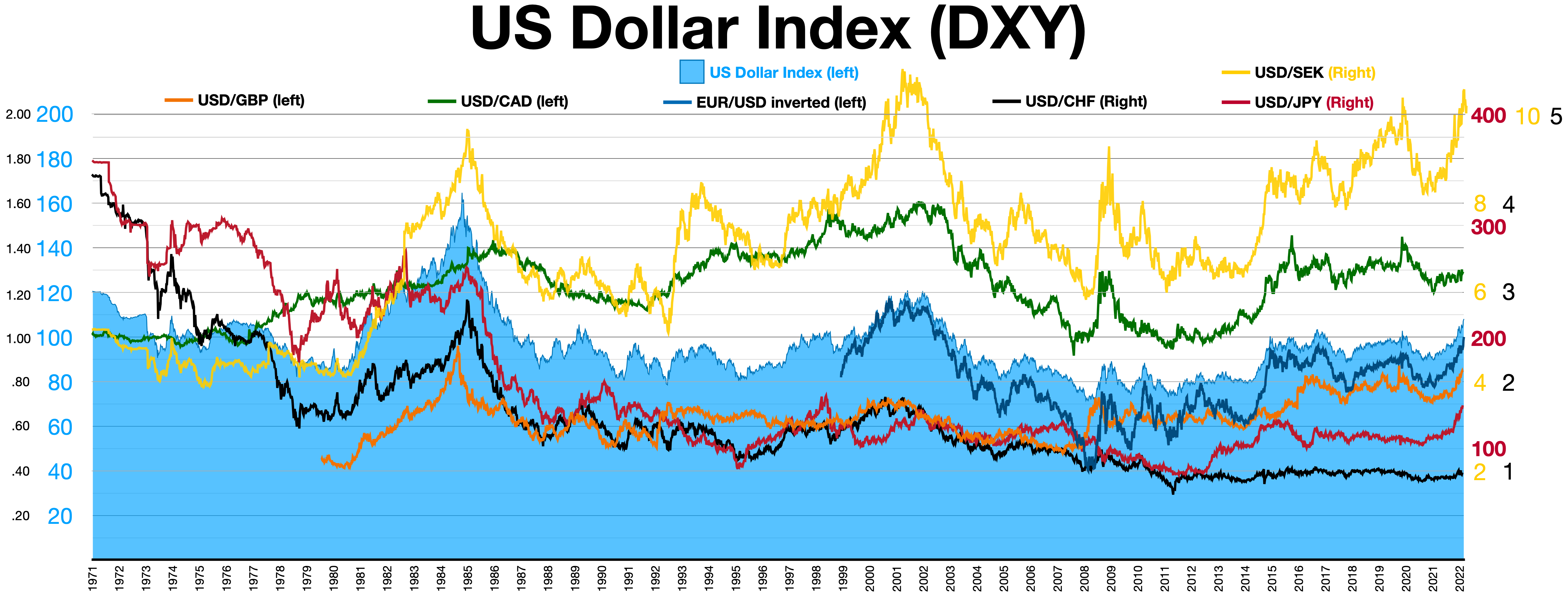
Since the Nixon shock in 1971, the U.S. dollar has depreciated significantly against the Japanese yen and Swiss franc, while appreciating against the Swedish krona.

In December 1971, representatives of the Group of Ten met at the Smithsonian Institution in Washington, D.C. to reassess exchange rates and revalue their currencies. At the meetings, the U.S. pledged to peg the dollar at $38/ounce of gold, effectively devaluing it by 7.9%, while the other countries agreed to appreciate their currencies against the dollar with ±2.25% trading bands against the U.S. dollar. The group also agreed on a plan to balance the world financial system using special drawing rights, and the U.S. import surcharge was dropped.

Although the Smithsonian Agreement was hailed by Nixon as a fundamental reorganization of international monetary markets, the dollar price in the gold market continued to cause pressure on its official rate. After a further 10% devaluation of the U.S. dollar was announced on February 14, 1973, Japan and the Organisation for European Economic Co-operation transitioned to a floating exchange rate system. Over the next decade, most of the industrialized world followed suit. Under the floating rate system, the value of the U.S. dollar plunged by a third in the 1970s and was subject to enormous speculation against foreign currencies.

The Nixon shock also indirectly led to the development of SWIFT, as the collapse of Bretton Woods and the shift to floating exchange rates exposed weakness in the telex-based system. This prompted international partners to find a way to move away from an entirely US control regime of payment settlement.

Today, the governments and central banks of most developed economies no longer utilize currency exchange rates to administer monetary policy; instead, they use interest rates and, to a lesser extent since the 1980s, adjustments to the money supply to prioritize price stability. In many developing economies, central banks continue to target a fixed exchange rate system.

== Legacy ==
Even many years later, Paul Volcker expressed regret over the abandonment of the Bretton Woods system and failure to establish a replacement system of fixed exchange. In 2011, Volcker said,

Nobody's in charge. The Europeans couldn't live with the uncertainty and made their own currency and now that's in trouble.

— Paul Volcker, The Nixon Shock, Bloomberg BusinessWeek (2011)

== See also ==
- Criticism of the Federal Reserve
- Economic Stabilization Act of 1970
- Impossible trinity
- Petrodollar recycling
- Triffin dilemma
- United States Bullion Depository
