= Erwin Rothbarth =

German economist

- Born: 16 December 1913; Frankfurt am Main
- Died: 25 November 1944 (aged 30); Venray, Netherlands
- Cause of death: Killed in action
- Spouse: Myfawwy Charles (m. 1940)

Academic background
- Influences: John Maynard Keynes

Academic work
- Discipline: Economist and statistician
- Institutions: London School of Economics
- Notable ideas: The measurement of GDP

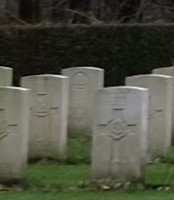
Gravestone Erwin Rothbarth in Overloon 1944/2016.

Erwin Rothbarth (16 December 1913 – 25 November 1944) was a German economist and statistician. He worked as a research assistant for John Maynard Keynes and made important contributions to the measurement of GDP and the modelling of individual consumption.

== Biography ==
Rothbarth was born in Frankfurt am Main to a German Jewish family. His father, Otto Rothbarth was a lawyer. Rothbarth joined the Social Democratic Party of Germany. He studied law at the University of Frankfurt from 1932 to 1933. He graduated from the London School of Economics in 1936 and remained there as a researcher in economics and statistics until 1938. He moved to Cambridge University in 1938 and became a research assistant for John Maynard Keynes in 1939.

From May to August 1940 Rothbarth was interned by the British government due to his German nationality. In September 1940 he married Myfanwy Charles (M.C. Rintoul). He volunteered for the Suffolk Regiment of the British Army and was killed in heavy fighting near Venray, The Netherlands while serving with the 1st Battalion of his regiment.

== Contributions to Economics ==
=== GDP ===
While working as Keynes' research assistant for the influential article How to Pay for the War Rothbarth developed techniques which are now used to calculate GDP. Rothbarth calculated for Keynes statistics for private income and outlay, government income and outlay, national output, and savings and investment. Rothbarth's main contribution, and the main advancement from the older work of Colin Clark on national income, is the concept of Gross National Income which is a large component of modern GDP figures. Rothbarth's and Keynes' figures are also the first GDP figures to be based on a double-entry accounting system in order to ensure their accuracy.

=== New Goods ===
The problem of New Goods in Industrial Organisation is of how to estimate the value that consumers put on the availability of goods and services which previously did not exist. A book-length treatment of the subject by Timothy Bresnahan and Robert J. Gordon credits Rothbarth with pioneering the subject in his 1941 article 'The Measurement of Changes in Real Income under Conditions of Rationing'. Rothbarth's treatment of the problem was the first mathematical attempt at the problem (John Hicks had discussed the problem in 1940). His approach involves the estimation of a 'virtual reservation price' at which consumers would choose to purchase none of the good and then examining the changes in consumers' consumption choices once the new good becomes available in order to infer the consumers' valuation of the new good.

== Bibliography ==
- Rothbarth, E. (1939), 'Retail Sales in Great Britain, 1931–1938.' Cambridge Research Scheme of the National Institute of Economic and Social Research, Interim Report 3
- Rothbarth, E. (1941), 'The Measurement of Changes in Real Income under Conditions of Rationing.' Review of Economic Studies, 8, pp. 100–107
- Rothbarth, E. (1941), 'The Conditions of Economic Progress, By Colin Clark.' Economic Journal, 51, pp. 120–124
- Rothbarth, E. (1941), 'Statistical Testing of Business Cycle Theories: II; Business Cycles in the United States of America, 1919–32, By J. Timbergen.' Economic Journal, 51, pp. 293–297
- Rothbarth, E. (1942), 'Business Cycles: A Theoretical, Historical and Statistical Analysis of the Capitalist Process, By Joseph A. Schumpeter.' Economic Journal, 52, pp. 223–229
- Rothbarth, E. (1943–45), 'A Note on the Index Number Problem.' Review of Economic Studies, 11 & 12, pp. 91–98
- Rothbarth, E. (1946), 'Causes of the Superior Efficiency of USA Industry as Compared to British Industry.' Economic Journal, 56, pp. 383–390
