= Donald Markwell =

Australian social scientist (born 1959)

Donald John Markwell AM (born 19 April 1959) is an Australian social scientist, who has been described as a "renowned Australian educational reformer". He was appointed Head of St Mark's College, Adelaide, from November 2019. He was Senior Adviser to the Leader of the Government in the Australian Senate from October 2015 to December 2017, and was previously Senior Adviser on Higher Education to the Australian Minister for Education.

== Early life and education ==
Markwell was born in Quilpie, Queensland. He was educated at Brisbane Grammar School followed by the University of Queensland, the University of Oxford (where he was the 1981 Rhodes Scholar for Queensland) and Princeton University. He studied economics, law and international relations.

== Career ==
Markwell was a research fellow of New College, Oxford, from 1985 to 1986, and then a fellow and tutor in Politics at Merton College, Oxford, from 1986 to 1997. He served as a reforming warden (CEO) of Trinity College (University of Melbourne) from 1997 to 2007; deputy vice-chancellor (Education) of the University of Western Australia from 2007 to 2009; and warden of Rhodes House, Oxford, from 2009 to 2012 (succeeding Sir Colin Lucas).

From 2007 to 2009, Markwell led a curriculum review at the University of Western Australia. The review proposed significant curriculum reform; it was implemented as "New Courses 2012".

Markwell was the first Rhodes Scholar and the second Australian to serve as warden of Rhodes House (the global CEO of the Rhodes Trust and the Rhodes Scholarships). As warden from 2009 to 2012, Markwell expanded activities for Rhodes Scholars in Oxford, expanded alumni communications, events and consultation, initiated governance reform and raised significant funds to support the Rhodes Scholarships. The appointments of several new Rhodes trustees from around the world included John MacBain, who was later recognized as the "Second Century Founder" of the Rhodes Trust for a gift of £75 million. As well as discussing leadership, liberal education and collegiate education, Markwell's speeches drew attention to Cecil Rhodes' goal of promoting international peace. He initiated discussion on increasing the number of countries in which Rhodes Scholarships are offered, leading to the later creation of Rhodes Scholarships for China and other countries. He is credited with helping to initiate the review of undergraduate women's leadership at Princeton University, chaired by Nannerl O. Keohane, and of helping to make scholarships in South Africa open to women.

In 2012, Markwell stepped down as warden of Rhodes House to return to Australia, where his family lives, and to become the executive director of the Menzies Research Centre. The chairman of the Rhodes Trust, John Hood, paid tribute to "the extraordinary energy and commitment Markwell has brought to the advancement of the Rhodes Trust's affairs", and to the "many notable accomplishments under his leadership".

As executive director of the Menzies Research Centre (a public policy think tank in Australia named for Australia's longest-serving prime minister, Sir Robert Menzies, and associated with the Liberal Party of Australia), his activities included consultations with Julie Bishop for developing a 'New Colombo Plan' to encourage Australian university students to study abroad in Asia-Pacific universities, and co-editing State of the Nation: aspects of Australian public policy.

In October 2013, following the Australian federal election of September 2013, Markwell was appointed as senior adviser on higher education to the new Australian minister for education, Christopher Pyne, MP. In October 2015, after the change of prime minister from Tony Abbott to Malcolm Turnbull, he became senior adviser to the new leader of the government in the Australian Senate, George Brandis, who was also Attorney-General of Australia, until December 2017. Markwell gave constitutional advice to the Prime Minister and Attorney-General during the prorogation, recall, and double dissolution of the Australian Parliament in 2016.

In November 2017, it was announced that Markwell would become head of St Paul's College at the University of Sydney in early 2018. As head (later warden) of St Paul's College, he is credited with leading the vigorous implementation of an Action Plan for Cultural Renewal arising from a review of the college's culture led by Elizabeth Broderick, securing a new St Paul's College Act 2018 from the New South Wales Parliament to commence modernising the governance of the college, strengthening the relationship between the college and the University of Sydney, and leading the creation of a Graduate House for postgraduate students and academics within St Paul's College.

In July 2019, he was appointed Head of St Mark's College (University of Adelaide) from November that year.

Portraits of Markwell hang at Trinity College, University of Melbourne, and Rhodes House, Oxford.

Markwell was appointed as a Member the Order of Australia (AM) in the 2023 Australia Day Honours for "significant service to education in a range of roles".

== Writings ==
Markwell's academic works include contributions to international relations, political science, the history of economic thought, constitutional history and public law, and education. They address such questions as how to promote order and peace in the international society of states, the role of conventions in constitutional systems, and higher education for the 21st century.

John Maynard Keynes and International Relations: Economic Paths to War and Peace was widely cited in the Keynesian revival of 2008 for its emphasis on international economic cooperation (including the international coordination of economic policies, and the development of international economic institutions such as the International Monetary Fund and World Bank). It was also cited for its emphasis on economic causes of war and economic means to promote peace, and in a 2013 controversy for rebutting the claim of Niall Ferguson that the ideas in Keynes's The Economic Consequences of the Peace (1919) were significantly influenced by Keynes's attraction to a German banker, Carl Melchior. It is one of a number of Markwell's publications on both John Maynard Keynes, and idealism in international relations (especially interwar idealists, such as Sir Alfred Zimmern [who sought to promote the 'rule of law' in international society], Cecil Rhodes, [who aimed to promote peace through international scholarships], Florence Stawell, and Keynes himself, who sought economic means to promote peace).

Markwell's contributions to international relations are in the tradition of the so-called English school of international relations theory, and specifically of Hedley Bull, but with an added emphasis on economic determinants of order in the international society of states. His study of Keynes and Australia traces the links between Keynes and Australia, from Keynes's opposition to the approach of William Morris Hughes to reparations after World War I, through the early impact in Australia of Keynesian ideas in the 1930s and 1940s, to the role of Australia in the creation of the International Monetary Fund and the World Bank at Bretton Woods in 1944.

Markwell's writings in political science and public law have been especially concerned with constitutional issues, including federalism, constitutional conventions in the Westminster system, and the monarchy and republicanism in Commonwealth countries, including the reserve powers. He uncovered the extensive history of consultations of judges of the High Court (such as Sir Samuel Griffith and Sir Edmund Barton) by Governor-Generals of Australia. He worked closely with the former Governor-General of Australia, Sir Zelman Cowen, in the writing of A public life: the memoirs of Zelman Cowen, including through an oral history project with Sir Zelman Cowen. He spoke at the state memorial service or funeral of two Governors-General of Australia (Sir John Kerr and Sir Zelman Cowen), and has written on "the office of Governor-General".

Markwell's book Constitutional Conventions and the Headship of State: Australian Experience, published in 2016, is a selection of papers focused on constitutional conventions and the role of the Governor-General in Australia.

In 1984, he co-edited with George Brandis and Tom Harley a collection of essays, Liberals face the future: essays on Australian liberalism. In 2013, he co-edited with Rachael Thompson and Julian Leeser a further collection of essays, State of the Nation: aspects of Australian public policy, with critiques of Australian public policy since 2007 by 15 experts.

Markwell's A large and liberal education: higher education for the 21st century reflects his advocacy of broad undergraduate education, improving teaching and learning in universities, equity and access, the value of collegiate education and student engagement, and the importance of educational philanthropy. It consists largely of papers from his tenure as warden of Trinity College, University of Melbourne.

Its sequel, 'Instincts to lead': on leadership, peace, and education, based on Markwell's speeches and writings on those topics as warden of Rhodes House, Oxford, and as deputy vice-chancellor (Education) at the University of Western Australia, was published in 2013. The title was drawn from Cecil Rhodes saying in his will that he wanted as Rhodes Scholars young people with 'instincts to lead'.

== Publications ==
- Brandis, George; Harley, Tom; Markwell, Don, eds. (1984). Liberals Face the Future: Essays on Australian Liberalism. Oxford & Melbourne: Oxford University Press. ISBN 9780195545050.
- Markwell, Donald J. (1987). The Crown and Australia (PDF). London: University of London. ISBN 9780902499669. Archived from the original (PDF) on 9 June 2007.
- Markwell, Donald (2000). Keynes and Australia. Sydney: Reserve Bank of Australia. Archived from the original on 27 June 2001.
- Markwell, Donald, ed. (2003). "Improving Teaching and Learning in Universities" (PDF). B-HERT NEWS, Business-Higher Education Round Table. Melbourne. Archived from the original (PDF) on 12 April 2005.
- Markwell, Donald (26 October 2006). John Maynard Keynes and International Relations: Economic Paths to War and Peace. Oxford & New York: Oxford University Press. ISBN 9780198292364.
- Markwell, Don (2007). 'A Large and Liberal Education': Higher Education for the 21st Century. Melbourne: Australian Scholarly Publishing & Trinity College, University of Melbourne. ISBN 978-1740971508.
- Markwell, Donald (2009). "Keynes and International Economic and Political Relations". Trinity Papers. 33. Trinity College, University of Melbourne. Archived from the original on 6 March 2011.
- Markwell, Donald (2010). The need for breadth: on liberal education and the value of university residential colleges. Ashley Lectures, Trent University, Canada
- Markwell, Don; Thompson, Rachael; Leeser, Julian, eds. (2013). State of the Nation: Aspects of Australian Public Policy. Connor Court. ISBN 978-1922168405.
- Markwell, Don (2013). 'Instincts to Lead': On Leadership, Peace, and Education. Connor Court. ISBN 978-1922168702.
- Markwell, Don (2016). Constitutional Conventions and the Headship of State: Australian Experience. Connor Court. ISBN 978-1925501155.

== See also ==
- 2008–09 Keynesian resurgence
- Constitutional conventions
- Idealism (international relations)
- Keynesian economics

Academic offices
Preceded by Evan Burge	Warden of Trinity College, University of Melbourne; 1997-2007	Succeeded by Andrew McGowan
Preceded by Sir Colin Lucas	Warden of Rhodes House, Oxford; 2009-12	Succeeded by Charles R. Conn
Preceded by Ivan Head	Warden of St Paul's College, University of Sydney; 2018-2019	Succeeded by Edward Loane
Preceded by Rose Alwyn	Head of St Mark's College (University of Adelaide); 2019-	Succeeded by incumbent
Non-profit organization positions
Preceded by Julian Leeser	Executive Director of Menzies Research Centre; 2012-2013	Succeeded by Nick Cater
