= Sally Marks =

American historian (1931–2018)

- Born: January 18, 1931; New Haven, Connecticut, U.S.
- Died: January 13, 2018 (aged 86); Bethlehem, Pennsylvania, U.S.

Academic background
- Education: Wellesley College, University of North Carolina at Chapel Hill, London School of Economics

Academic work
- Institutions: Rhode Island College

Sally J. Marks (January 18, 1931 – January 14, 2018) was an American historian and author specialising in the field of post-First World War diplomatic history.

== Biography ==
Marks was born in New Haven, Connecticut. After graduation from Wellesley College, she worked for the US Department of Defense. Marks received a master's degree at the University of North Carolina at Chapel Hill, before doing a PhD in the United Kingdom at the London School of Economics.

Marks lectured in history at Rhode Island College, receiving the Mary Tucker Thorp College Professorship in 1983. Her research during the 1970s focused on then-newly opened archives of diplomatic correspondence from the period during and immediately after the First World War. Her discoveries in these archives cast doubt on the then-popular viewpoint advocated by John Maynard Keynes that the Versailles treaty had been excessively punitive. In 1988 she took early retirement from teaching at the college to focus full-time on research. From the 1990s onwards Marks suffered from myalgic encephalomyelitis/chronic fatigue syndrome, and in later life from poor eyesight.

Historian William R. Keylor of Boston University said of her work that it had "...precipitated what might be called the post-Keynesian version of the economic portion of the peace settlement of 1919 that has won widespread acceptance in the profession".

== Awards and honors ==
Marks received the George Louis Beer Prize for her 1981 book Innocent Abroad: Belgium at the Paris Peace Conference. She also received the Phi Alpha Theta senior scholar award, as well as fellowships from the Woodrow Wilson Foundation and the American Council of Learned Societies.

== Books ==
Marks was the author of books including:

- The Illusion of Peace: International Relations in Europe 1918–1933 (Macmillan, 1976)
- Innocent Abroad: Belgium at the Paris Peace Conference of 1919 (University of North Carolina Press, 1981)
- The Ebbing of European Ascendancy: An International History of the World, 1914–1945 (Arnold, 2002)
- Paul Hymans: Belgium (Makers of the Modern World: The Peace Conferences of 1919–23 and Their Aftermath, Haus Publishing, 2010)
