= International Clearing Union =

Proposed financial institution in 1944

The International Clearing Union (ICU) was one of the institutions proposed to be set up at the 1944 United Nations Monetary and Financial Conference at Bretton Woods, New Hampshire, in the United States, by British economist John Maynard Keynes. Its aim was to establish regulation of currency exchange, a role eventually taken by the International Monetary Fund (IMF).

The International Clearing Union (ICU) would be a global bank whose role would be the clearance of trade between nations, similar to a trade exchange with every country as a member. All international trade would be denominated in a special unit of account, the proposed bancor. The bancor was to have had a fixed exchange rate with national currencies, and would have been used to measure the balance of trade between nations. Goods exported would add bancors to a country's account, while goods imported would subtract them. Each nation would be incentivized to keep their bancor balance close to zero by one of two methods: in the case of an excessively positive bancor balance, part of their surplus would be taken and applied to the Clearing Union's Reserve Fund. In the case of an excessively negative bancor balance, their currency’s exchange rate would be lowered, making imports more expensive and exports cheaper. In this way nations would be encouraged to buy other nations’ products.

Gold and national currency would no longer be used in international trade and no longer move between countries.

The ICU is similar to Silvio Gesell's proposal for an International Valuta Association, and the latter idea may have strongly influenced the former.

== See also ==
- Asian Clearing Union
- Bancor
- Bank for International Settlements
- European Payments Union
- E. F. Schumacher
