= Larry Elliott =

English journalist and author

Larry Elliott CBE (born 29 August 1955) is an English journalist and author who focuses on economic issues. He was the economics editor at The Guardian until November 2024, and has published seven books on related issues, six of them in partnership with Dan Atkinson.

== Early life ==
Elliott was educated at St Albans School, an independent school for boys in St Albans, Hertfordshire, in southern England, followed by Fitzwilliam College, Cambridge, where he read history.

== Journalistic career ==
- The Evening Post-Echo, Hemel Hempstead, 1978 to 1983
- Press Association, 1983 to 1988
- The Guardian, 1988 to date

Elliott's areas of particular interest are globalisation, trade, Europe, development, and the interface between economics and the environment. He is on the editorial board of Catalyst, on the board of the Scott Trust, a council member of the Overseas Development Institute and a visiting fellow at the University of Hertfordshire.

Elliott's 2007 book, Fantasy Island, argued that the British economy was weaker than it appeared and that a recession could dramatically damage its base of services. He supported Britain leaving the European Union and voted to leave the European Economic Community in the 1975 referendum.

Elliott, an outspoken critic of the European Union, authored articles for The Guardian such as “Brexit is a rejection of Globalisation”. He stated that the British people's decision to leave the European Union in 2016 is testament to its failure to act on its promises to protect its member states from the worst effects of globalisation, which he considers would have included the funding of more affordable homes and the provision of more employment opportunities.

Elliott was economics editor of The Guardian from 1996 to November 2024.

== Works ==
- Europe Didn't Work by Larry Elliott and Dan Atkinson (Yale University Press, 2017).
- Europe Isn't Working by Larry Elliott and Dan Atkinson (Yale University Press, 2016).
- Going South: Why Britain will have a Third World Economy by 2014 by Larry Elliott and Dan Atkinson (Palgrave Macmillan, 2012).
- The Gods that Failed: How Blind Faith in Markets has Cost us Our Future by Larry Elliott and Dan Atkinson (The Bodley Head, 2008) ISBN 978-1-84792-030-0.
- Fantasy Island by Larry Elliott and Dan Atkinson (Constable, 2007) ISBN 1-84529-605-2.
- In or Out: Labour and the Euro by Larry Elliott, Andrew Gamble, Janet Bush (Fabian Society, 2002) ISBN 0-7163-0601-8.
- The Age of Insecurity by Larry Elliott, Dan Atkinson (Verso Books, 1998) ISBN 0-18-598484-3.
