= How to Pay for the War =

Book by John Maynard Keynes

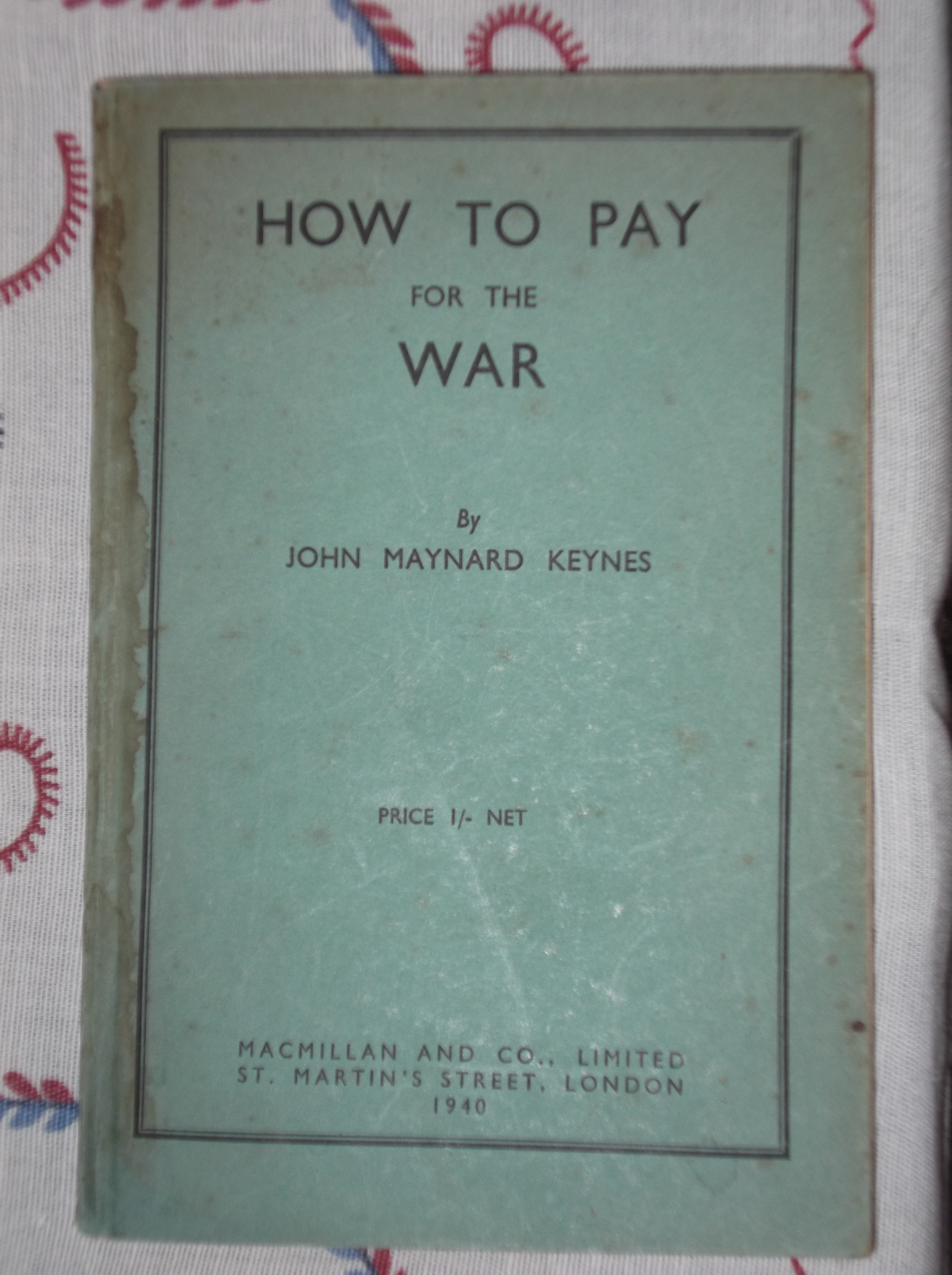
How to Pay for the War, 1940

How to Pay for the War: A Radical Plan for the Chancellor of the Exchequer is a book by John Maynard Keynes, published in 1940 by Macmillan and Co., Ltd. It is an application of the eponymous Keynesian thinking and principles to a practical economic problem, mainly that of financing a war.

== Summary ==
In How to Pay for the War, John Maynard Keynes describes a macroeconomic strategy of how the UK, a country with a population at the time of 40 million people (excluding the wider British Empire), could conduct a long war (World War II) against Germany, a nation of 80 million. At the time How to Pay for the War was written, neither the United States nor the Soviet Union were at war with either Germany or Japan. As a result, the first step for Britain to effectively conduct a war against Germany was to mobilize all its resources for production. Thus, the first two chapters of How to Pay for the War, are an argument for the need for full employment and chapter 3, Our Output Capacity and The National Income, is a manual to achieve full employment.

Keynes maintained, however, that the resources of Britain, even at full employment, would not suffice to conduct a war against Germany. Internally, Britain would need to increase production while reducing consumption and diverting resources to the war effort. Externally, Britain would have to be able to count on more resources than internally available, running as large a deficit as its allies were willing to allow. Chapters IV (4) to X (10) and appendices II (2) to IV (4) are dedicated to measures for allocating resources to the war effort, while controlling prices and reducing wartime consumption.

Keynes outlined a plan for Deferred Pay that would, in part, be legislated in the Budget of Sir Kingsley Wood, Chancellor of the Exchequer. The deferred pay became a system of post-war credits which were progressively repaid after the war, albeit at a reduced value.

Keynes devotes much attention to price controls, proposing a number of measures to control (but not planning to eliminate) inflation, measures including deferred pay and forced savings. Most of the book, Chapters IV to X, is dedicated to the problems of resource allocation and price control.

The book is an exercise in Keynesian macroeconomics and is a prime example of Keynesian analysis and technique, by John Maynard Keynes himself.
