= Peter Pugh =

British author

Peter Pugh is a British author. He was educated at Oundle School and Churchill College, Cambridge, where he read history. After graduating he held several marketing positions with such companies as Gillette Industries.

In 1984, he used his knowledge of the British business scene to begin writing corporate histories. He has written and is writing books on Carless, Ivory and Sime, Blue Circle, Asda, Harrisons and Crosfield, SD Scicon, George Williamson and Co., Walter Alexander, WAPCO, Mecca, PFG Hodgson Kenyon, The Grand Hotel, Eastbourne, the Royal Bath, Bournemouth, Thomas de la Rue and the Belfry.

He also wrote Is Guinness Good for You?, a book on the Guinness scandal, and on the City called City Slickers Handbook.

Pugh is married with three sons and lives in Barrington, Cambridgeshire.
