= Dan Atkinson =

British journalist and author

Dan Atkinson (born 1961 in Brighton) is a British journalist and author.

Atkinson has been an independent writer and commentator on financial and economic affairs since 2017 after he had been financial editor of Sticky Content since 2013. Before then, he was economics editor of The Mail on Sunday since 2000 before which he was for ten years a financial correspondent with The Guardian. In that role, he specialised in issues of regulation and fraud.

Between 1985 and 1990, he was deputy City Editor of the Press Association, which he joined after an apprenticeship and a stint as business correspondent at the Reading Evening Post.

He lives in Sussex.

== Works ==
- Europe Didn't Work by Larry Elliott and Dan Atkinson (Yale University Press; 2017).
- Europe Isn't Working by Larry Elliott and Dan Atkinson (Yale University Press; 2016).
- Going South: Why Britain will have a Third World Economy by 2014 by Larry Elliott and Dan Atkinson (Palgrave Macmillan; 2012).
- The Gods that Failed: How Blind Faith in Markets has Cost us Our Future by Larry Elliott and Dan Atkinson (The Bodley Head, 2008).
- Fantasy Island by Larry Elliott and Dan Atkinson (Constable, 2007).
- Financial Mail on Sunday Complete Guide to the City by Dan Atkinson (Random House Business Books, 2002).
- The Age of Insecurity by Larry Elliott, Dan Atkinson (Verso Books, 1998).
- The Wrecker's Lamp: Do Currency Markets Leave Us on the Rocks? by Ruth Kelly and Dan Atkinson (Institute for Public Policy Research, 1994).
