= Carl Melchior =

German lawyer, judge, and banker (1871–1933)

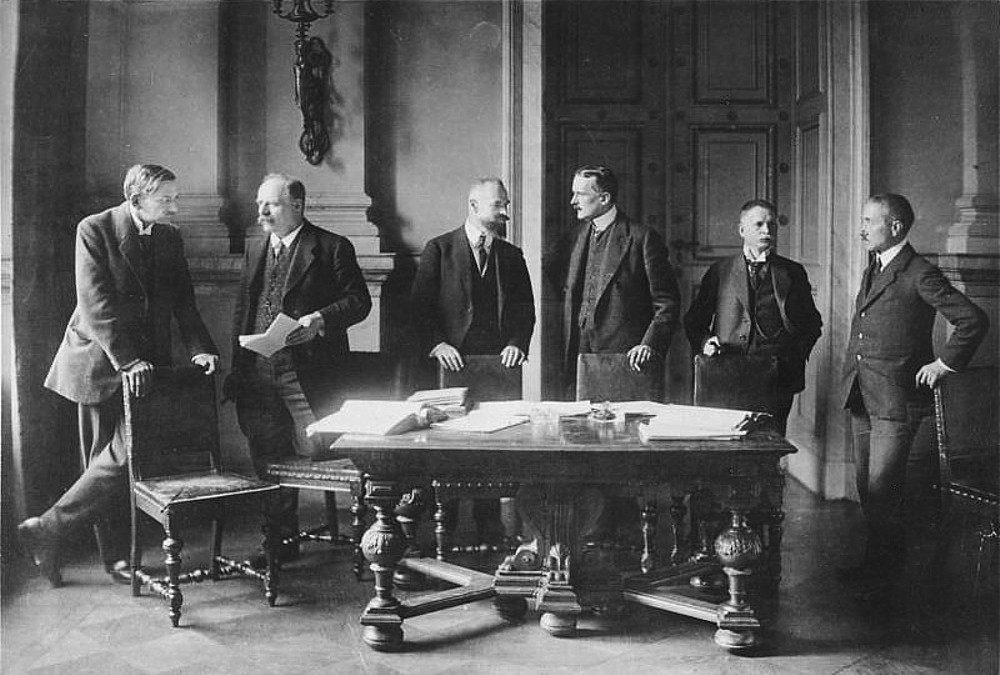
- Melchior (furthest to the right) as part of the German delegation in Versailles, 1919
- Born: October 13, 1871; Hamburg
- Died: December 30, 1933 (aged 62); Hamburg

Carl Melchior (October 13, 1871 – December 30, 1933) was a German lawyer and judge, and later became a banker and vice-president of the Bank for International Settlements.

== Working life ==
In 1900 Melchior was made legal counsel to Hamburg banking concern, M. M. Warburg & Co.. During World War I, he served with a Bavarian regiment of the German Army and was seriously injured at Metz when he fell from a horse. After his recovery, Melchior went to work for the German government and beginning in 1919 served as an advisor for the financial and economic negotiations that began at the Paris Peace Conference. Following implementation of the terms of the Treaty of Versailles, Germany was faced with numerous economic problems.

By 1921, Melchior deemed it advisable for the country to accept what he saw as an impossible war reparations burden stating: "We can get through the first two or three years with the aid of foreign loans. By the end of that time foreign nations will have realised that these large payments can only be made by huge German exports and these exports will ruin the trade in England and America so that creditors themselves will come to us to request modification.""

Over the decade, Melchior played an increasingly prominent role in the lengthy negotiations, earning international recognition for his command of both the financial and legal issues involved. Owing to an intimate personal relationship forged with John Maynard Keynes at the Paris Peace Conference, he served as the conduit through which the latter became an informal adviser to the German government on reparation matters.

After having been made a partner at M. M. Warburg & Co., Carl Melchior became one of the co-founders of the Hamburg Morocco Society, an entity created to promote German mining in Morocco and expand economic activities in what was a country dominated by French business interests. In 1922, Melchior was appointed Chairman of the Supervisory Board of the Hamburg based pharmaceutical-related consumer products giant Beiersdorf AG. His growing influence in the German economic community resulted in his 1926 appointment as the German representative on the League of Nations' Finance Committee. In 1928, he was named Committee chairman and following its creation in 1930, he served as a member of the board of the Bank for International Settlements in Basel, Switzerland. In 1933, and by then its vice-president, he was forcibly dismissed by the new Nazi administration in Berlin, with the silent acquiescence of his colleagues . His work resulted in him becoming friends with British economist John Maynard Keynes.

== Private life ==
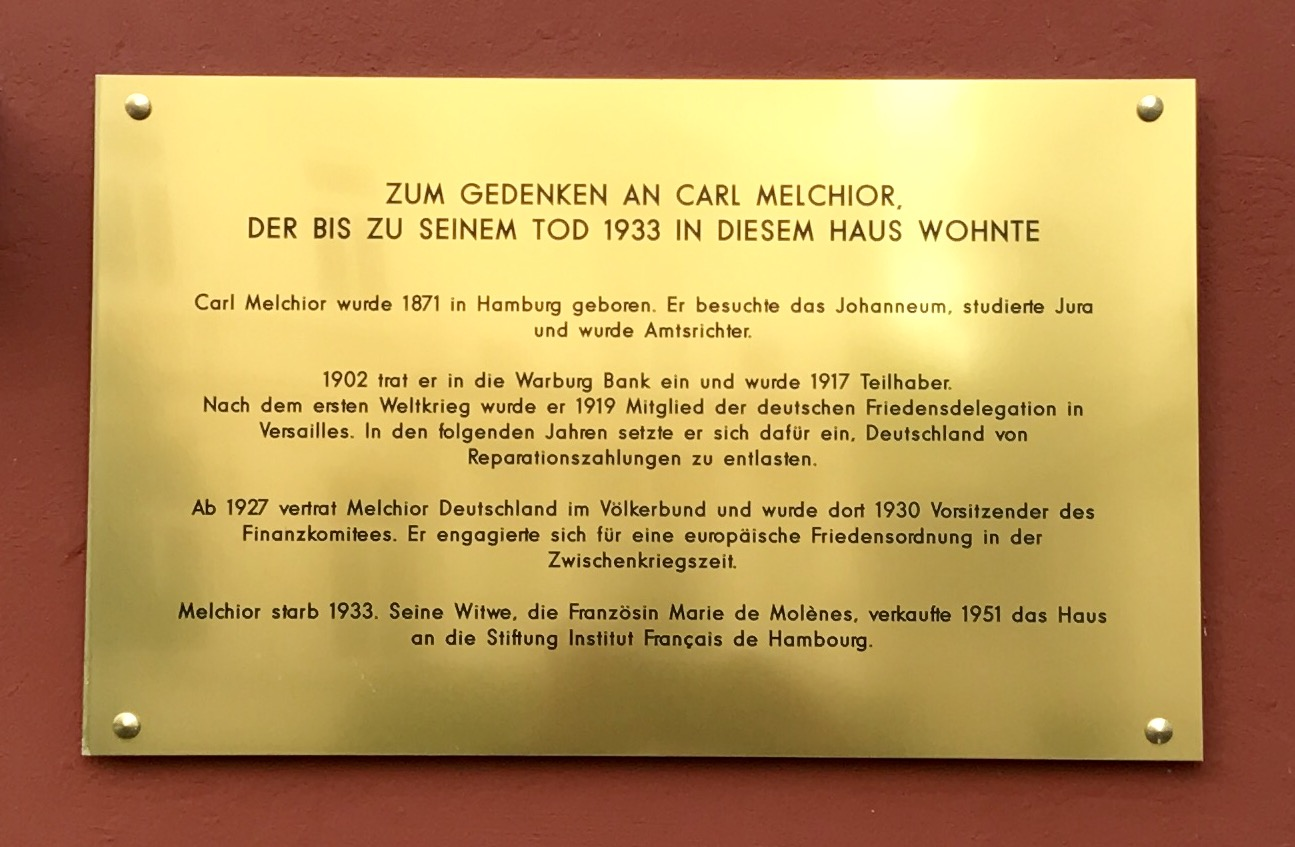
Commemorative plaque for Carl Melchior, Heimhuder Straße 55, Hamburg, also mentioning how the building was sold by Melchior's widow Marie Melchior de Molènes to the French Institute in 1951

A bachelor for many years, Melchior eventually married his long-time mistress, the French romance novelist Marie de Molènes with whom he had a son, Charles Melchior de Molènes. In the last few years of his life, he suffered from severe heart problems and in December 1933 died following a stroke. His grave is in Hamburg on the Ohlsdorf Jewish Cemetery, area L1.

== Legacy ==
In his memory, the Carl Melchior Chair for International Policy was established at the Hebrew University of Jerusalem in 1984 and in 1999 the university created the Carl Melchior Minerva Center.
