= Bretton Woods system =

Financial-economic agreement reached in 1944

Bretton Woods Agreements Act
- Long title: An Act to provide for the participation of the United States in the International Monetary Fund and the International Bank for Reconstruction and Development.
- Enacted by: the 79th United States Congress

Citations
- Public law: Pub. L. 79-171
- Statutes at Large: 59 Stat. 512

Legislative history
- Introduced in the House as H.R. 3314 by Brent Spence on May 25, 1945; Signed into law by President Harry S. Truman on July 31, 1945

The Bretton Woods system of monetary management established the rules for commercial relations among 44 countries, including the United Kingdom, United States, Canada, European countries, and Australia, after the 1944 Bretton Woods Agreement until the Jamaica Accords in 1976. The Bretton Woods system was the first example of a fully negotiated monetary order intended to govern monetary relations among independent states. The Bretton Woods system required countries to guarantee convertibility of their currencies into U.S. dollars with the dollar convertible to gold bullion for foreign governments and central banks. It envisioned greater cooperation among countries to prevent future competitive devaluations, and thus established the International Monetary Fund (IMF) to monitor exchange rates and lend reserve currencies to countries with balance of payments deficits. According to Barry Eichengreen, the Bretton Woods system operated successfully due to three factors: "low international capital mobility, tight financial regulation, and the dominant economic and financial position of the United States and the dollar".

Preparing to rebuild the international economic system while World War II was still being fought, delegates from 44 Allied countries gathered at the Mount Washington Hotel in Bretton Woods, New Hampshire, United States, for the United Nations Monetary and Financial Conference, also known as the Bretton Woods Conference. The delegates deliberated from 1 to 22 July 1944, and signed the Bretton Woods agreement on its final day. Setting up a system of rules, institutions, and procedures to regulate the international monetary system, these accords established the IMF and the International Bank for Reconstruction and Development (IBRD), which today is part of the World Bank Group. The United States, which controlled two-thirds of the world's gold, insisted that the Bretton Woods system rest on both gold and the US dollar. Soviet representatives attended the conference but later declined to ratify the final agreements, charging that the institutions they had created were "branches of Wall Street". These organizations became operational in 1945 after a sufficient number of countries had ratified the agreement.

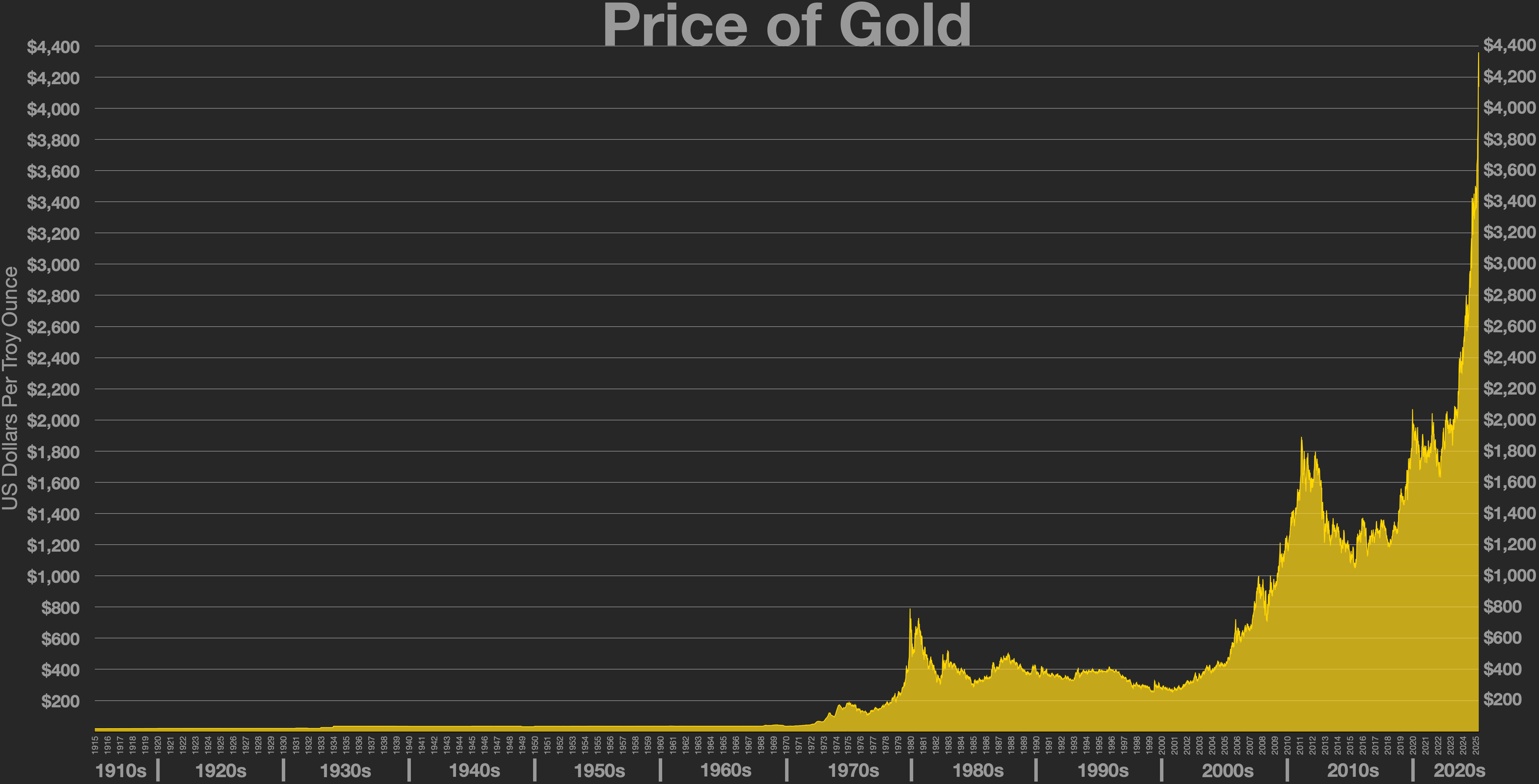
The price of gold, as denominated in US dollars, was stable until the collapse of the Bretton Woods system in the mid-1970s.

Eurodollar growth increased capital flows, challenging regulation of capital movements. On 15 August 1971, the United States ended the convertibility of the US dollar to gold, effectively bringing the Bretton Woods system to an end and rendering the dollar a fiat currency. Shortly thereafter, many fixed currencies (such as the pound sterling) also became free-floating, and the subsequent era has been characterized by floating exchange rates. The end of Bretton Woods was formally ratified by the Jamaica Accords in 1976. Critics argue that the system's reliance on the U.S. dollar allowed the United States to operate with fewer constraints than other nations, while fixed exchange rates limited countries such as the major European economies and Japan in their ability to adjust monetary policy in response to rising inflation and shifting trade conditions. They also note that the IMF and World Bank often imposed policy conditions that placed significant strain on developing countries and restricted the flexibility of local economies.

== Origins ==
The planners at Bretton Woods hoped to avoid a repetition of the Treaty of Versailles after World War I, which had created enough economic and political tension to lead to WWII. After World War I, Britain owed the U.S. substantial sums, which Britain could not repay because it had used the funds to support allies such as France during the War; the Allies could not pay back Britain, so Britain could not pay back the U.S. The solution at Versailles for the French, British, and Americans seemed to entail ultimately charging Germany for the debts. If the demands on Germany were unrealistic, then it was unrealistic for France to pay back Britain, and for Britain to pay back the US. Thus, many "assets" on bank balance sheets internationally were actually unrecoverable loans, which culminated in the 1931 banking crisis. Intransigence by creditor countries for the repayment of Allied war debts and reparations, combined with an inclination to isolationism, led to a breakdown of the international financial system and a worldwide economic depression.

The beggar thy neighbour policies that emerged as the crisis continued saw some trading countries using currency devaluations in an attempt to increase their competitiveness (i.e. raise exports and lower imports), though recent research suggests this de facto inflationary policy probably offset some of the contractionary forces in world price levels.

In the 1920s, international flows of speculative financial capital increased, leading to extremes in balance of payments situations in various European countries and the US. In the 1930s, world markets never broke through the barriers and restrictions on international trade and investment volume – barriers haphazardly constructed, nationally motivated and imposed. The various anarchic and often autarkic protectionist and neo-mercantilist national policies – often mutually inconsistent – that emerged over the first half of the decade worked inconsistently and self-defeatingly to promote national import substitution, increase national exports, divert foreign investment and trade flows, and even prevent certain categories of cross-border trade and investment outright. Global central bankers attempted to manage the situation by meeting with each other, but their understanding of the situation as well as difficulties in communicating internationally, hindered their abilities. The lesson was that simply having responsible, hard-working central bankers was not enough.

Britain in the 1930s had an exclusionary trade bloc with countries and territories of the British Empire known as the Sterling Area. If Britain imported more than it exported to such trading partners, recipients of pounds sterling within these countries tended to put them into London banks. This meant that though Britain was running a trade deficit, it had a financial account surplus, and payments balanced. Increasingly, Britain's positive balance of payments required keeping the wealth from across its Empire in British banks. One incentive for, say, South African holders of rand to park their wealth in London and to keep the money in Sterling, was a strongly valued pound sterling. In the 1920s, imports from the US threatened certain parts of the British domestic market for manufactured goods and the way out of the trade deficit was to devalue the currency. But Britain could not devalue, or the Empire surplus would leave its banking system.

Nazi Germany also worked with a bloc of controlled countries by 1940. Germany forced trading partners with a surplus to spend that surplus importing products from Germany. Thus, Britain survived by keeping Sterling-using countries' surpluses in its banking system, and Germany survived by forcing trading partners to purchase its own products. The U.S. was concerned that a sudden drop-off in war spending might return its population to the unemployment levels of the 1930s, and so wanted Sterling-using countries and everyone in Europe to be able to import from the US, hence the U.S. supported free trade and international convertibility of currencies into gold or dollars.

=== Post-war negotiations ===
When many of the same experts who observed the 1930s became the architects of a new, unified, post-war system at Bretton Woods, their guiding principles became "no more beggar thy neighbor" and "control flows of speculative financial capital". Preventing a repetition of this process of competitive devaluations was desired, but in a way that would not force debtor countries to contract their industrial bases by keeping interest rates at a level high enough to attract foreign bank deposits. John Maynard Keynes, wary of repeating the Great Depression, was behind Britain's proposal that surplus countries be forced by a "use-it-or-lose-it" mechanism, to either import from debtor states, build factories in debtor states or donate to debtor states. The U.S. opposed Keynes' plan, and a senior official at the U.S. Treasury, Harry Dexter White, rejected Keynes' proposals, in favor of an International Monetary Fund with enough resources to counteract destabilizing flows of speculative finance. However, unlike the modern IMF, White's proposed fund would have counteracted dangerous speculative flows automatically, with no political strings attached—i.e., no IMF conditionality. Economic historian Brad Delong writes that on almost every point where he was overruled by the Americans, Keynes was later proved correct by events.

Today these key 1930s events look different to scholars of the era (see the work of Barry Eichengreen Golden Fetters: The Gold Standard and the Great Depression, 1919–1939 and How to Prevent a Currency War); in particular, devaluations today are viewed with more nuance. Ben Bernanke's opinion on the subject follows:

... [T]he proximate cause of the world depression was a structurally flawed and poorly managed international gold standard. ... For a variety of reasons, including a desire of the Federal Reserve to curb the U.S. stock market boom, monetary policy in several major countries turned contractionary in the late 1920s—a contraction that was transmitted worldwide by the gold standard. What was initially a mild deflationary process began to snowball when the banking and currency crises of 1931 instigated an international "scramble for gold". Sterilization of gold inflows by surplus countries [the U.S. and France], substitution of gold for foreign exchange reserves, and runs on commercial banks all led to increases in the gold backing of money, and consequently to sharp unintended declines in national money supplies. Monetary contractions in turn were strongly associated with falling prices, output and employment. Effective international cooperation could in principle have permitted a worldwide monetary expansion despite gold standard constraints, but disputes over World War I reparations and war debts, and the insularity and inexperience of the Federal Reserve, among other factors, prevented this outcome. As a result, individual countries were able to escape the deflationary vortex only by unilaterally abandoning the gold standard and re-establishing domestic monetary stability, a process that dragged on in a halting and uncoordinated manner until France and the other Gold Bloc countries finally left gold in 1936. —Great Depression, B. Bernanke

In 1944 at Bretton Woods, as a result of the collective conventional wisdom of the time, representatives from all the leading allied states collectively favored a regulated system of fixed exchange rates, indirectly disciplined by a US dollar tied to gold—a system that relied on a regulated market economy with tight controls on the values of currencies. Flows of speculative international finance were curtailed by shunting them through and limiting them via central banks. This meant that international flows of investment went into foreign direct investment (FDI)—i.e., construction of factories overseas, rather than international currency manipulation or bond markets. Although the national experts disagreed to some degree on the specific implementation of this system, all agreed on the need for tight controls.

==== Economic security ====
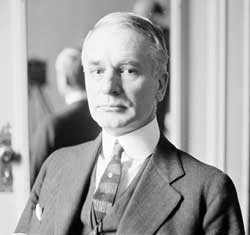
Cordell Hull, U.S. Secretary of State 1933–44

Also based on experience of the inter-war years, U.S. planners developed a concept of economic security—that a liberal international economic system would enhance the possibilities of postwar peace. One of those who saw such a security link was Cordell Hull, the United States Secretary of State from 1933 to 1944. (Note: For discussions of how liberal ideas motivated U.S. foreign economic policy after World War II, see, e.g., Kenneth Waltz, Man, the State and War (New York City: Columbia University Press, 1969) and yuvi.c Calleo and Benjamin M. Rowland, American and World Political Economy (Bloomington, Indiana: Indiana University Press, 1973).) Hull believed that the fundamental causes of the two world wars lay in economic discrimination and trade warfare. Hull argued

[U]nhampered trade dovetailed with peace; high tariffs, trade barriers, and unfair economic competition, with war … if we could get a freer flow of trade…freer in the sense of fewer discriminations and obstructions…so that one country would not be deadly jealous of another and the living standards of all countries might rise, thereby eliminating the economic dissatisfaction that breeds war, we might have a reasonable chance of lasting peace.

==== Rise of governmental intervention ====
The developed countries also agreed that the liberal international economic system required governmental intervention. In the aftermath of the Great Depression, public management of the economy had emerged as a primary activity of governments in the developed states. Employment, stability, and growth were now important subjects of public policy.

In turn, the role of government in the national economy had become associated with the assumption by the state of the responsibility for assuring its citizens of a degree of economic well-being. The system of economic protection for at-risk citizens sometimes called the welfare state grew out of the Great Depression, which created a popular demand for governmental intervention in the economy, and out of the theoretical contributions of the Keynesian school of economics, which asserted the need for governmental intervention to counter market imperfections.

However, increased government intervention in domestic economy brought with it isolationist sentiment that had a profoundly negative effect on international economics. The priority of national goals, independent national action in the interwar period, and the failure to perceive that those national goals could not be realized without some form of international collaboration—all resulted in "beggar-thy-neighbor" policies such as high tariffs, competitive devaluations that contributed to the breakdown of the gold-based international monetary system, domestic political instability, and international war. The lesson learned was, as the principal architect of the Bretton Woods system New Dealer Harry Dexter White put it:

the absence of a high degree of economic collaboration among the leading nations will … inevitably result in economic warfare that will be but the prelude and instigator of military warfare on an even vaster scale.

— Economic Security and the Origins of the Cold War, 1945–1950 (Note: Quoted in Robert A. Pollard, Economic Security and the Origins of the Cold War, 1945–1950 (New York: Columbia University Press, 1985), p. 8.)

To ensure economic stability and political peace, states agreed to cooperate to closely regulate the production of their currencies to maintain fixed exchange rates between countries with the aim of more easily facilitating international trade. This was the foundation of the U.S. vision of postwar world free trade, which also involved lowering tariffs and, among other things, maintaining a balance of trade via fixed exchange rates that would be favorable to the capitalist system.

Thus, the more developed market economies agreed with the U.S. vision of post-war international economic management, which intended to create and maintain an effective international monetary system and foster the reduction of barriers to trade and capital flows. In a sense, the new international monetary system was a return to a system similar to the pre-war gold standard, only using U.S. dollars as the world's new reserve currency until international trade reallocated the world's gold supply.

Thus, the new system would be devoid (initially) of governments meddling with their currency supply as they had during the years of economic turmoil preceding WWII. Instead, governments would closely police the production of their currencies and ensure that they would not artificially manipulate their price levels. If anything, Bretton Woods was a return to a time devoid of increased governmental intervention in economies and currency systems.

==== Atlantic Charter ====
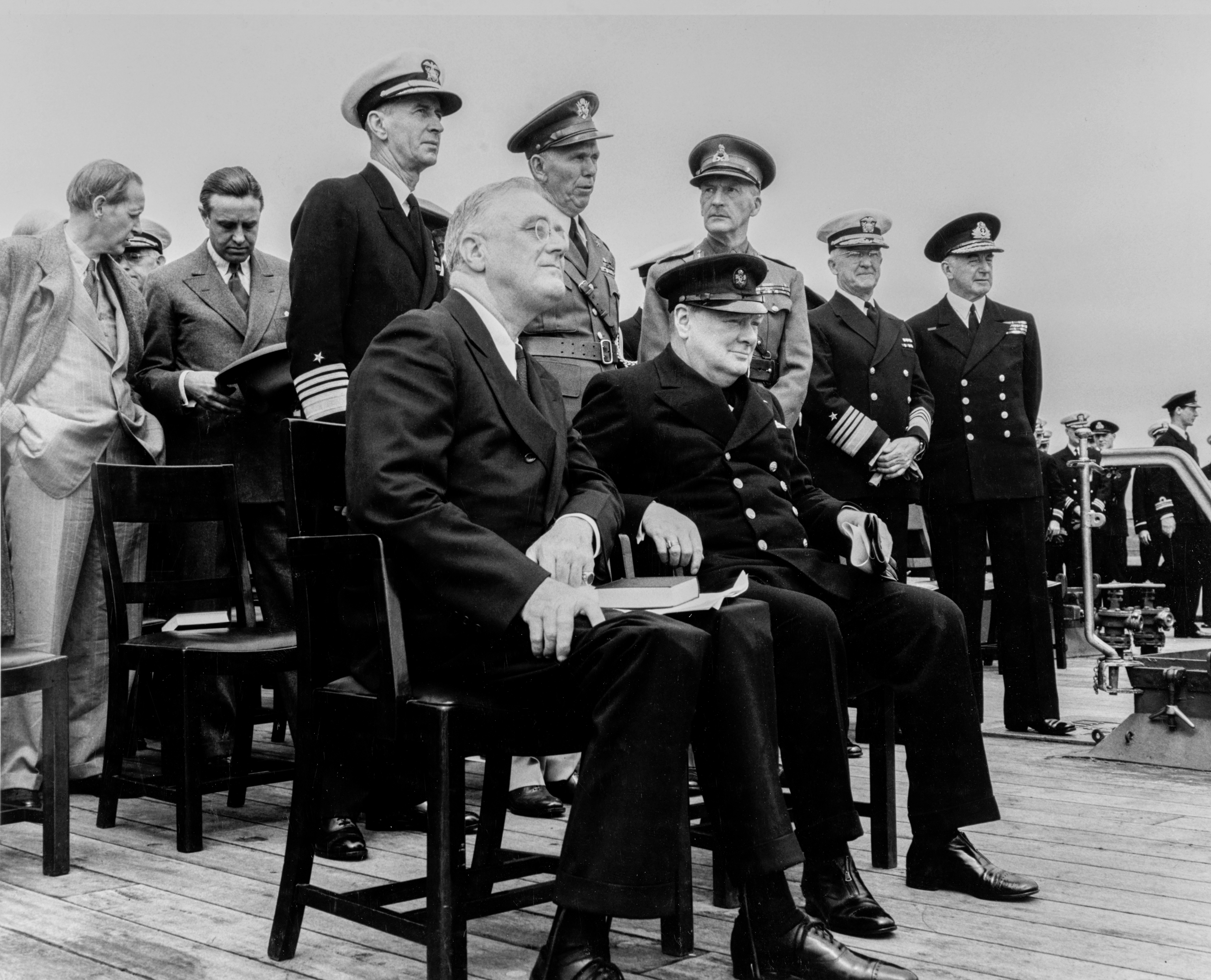
Roosevelt and Churchill's secret meeting of 9–12 August 1941 in Newfoundland resulted in the Atlantic Charter, which the U.S. and Britain officially announced two days later.

The Atlantic Charter, drafted during U.S. President Franklin D. Roosevelt's August 1941 meeting with British Prime Minister Winston Churchill on a ship in the North Atlantic, was the most notable precursor to the Bretton Woods Conference. Like Woodrow Wilson before him, whose "Fourteen Points" had outlined U.S. aims in the aftermath of the First World War, Roosevelt set forth a range of ambitious goals for the postwar world even before the U.S. had entered the Second World War.

The Atlantic Charter affirmed the right of all states to equal access to trade and raw materials. Moreover, the charter called for freedom of the seas (a principal U.S. foreign policy aim since France and Britain had first threatened U.S. shipping in the 1790s), the disarmament of aggressors, and the "establishment of a wider and more permanent system of general security".

As the war drew to a close, the Bretton Woods conference was the culmination of some two and a half years of planning for postwar reconstruction by the Treasuries of the U.S. and the UK. U.S. representatives studied with their British counterparts the reconstitution of what had been lacking between the two world wars: a system of international payments that would let countries trade without fear of sudden currency depreciation or wild exchange rate fluctuations—ailments that had nearly paralyzed world capitalism during the Great Depression.

Without a strong European market for U.S. goods and services, most policymakers believed, the U.S. economy would be unable to sustain the prosperity it had achieved during the war. In addition, U.S. unions had only grudgingly accepted government-imposed restraints on their demands during the war, but they were willing to wait no longer, particularly as inflation cut into the existing wage scales with painful force (by the end of 1945, there had already been major strikes in the automobile, electrical, and steel industries).

In early 1945, Bernard Baruch described the spirit of Bretton Woods as: if we can "stop subsidization of labor and sweated competition in the export markets", as well as prevent rebuilding of war machines, "oh boy, oh boy, what long term prosperity we will have." The United States could therefore use its position of influence to reopen and control the rules of the world economy, so as to give unhindered access to all countries' markets and materials.

==== Wartime devastation of Europe and East Asia ====
United States allies—economically exhausted by the war—needed U.S. assistance to rebuild their domestic production and to finance their international trade; indeed, they needed it to survive.

Before the war, the French and the British realized that they could no longer compete with U.S. industries in an open marketplace. During the 1930s, the British created their own economic bloc to shut out U.S. goods. Churchill did not believe that he could surrender that protection after the war, so he watered down the Atlantic Charter's "free access" clause before agreeing to it.

Yet U.S. officials were determined to open their access to the British empire. The combined value of British and U.S. trade was well over half of all the world's trade in goods. For the U.S. to open global markets, it first had to split the British (trade) empire. While Britain had economically dominated the 19th century, U.S. officials intended the second half of the 20th to be under U.S. hegemony.

A senior official of the Bank of England commented:

One of the reasons Bretton Woods worked was that the U.S. was clearly the most powerful country at the table and so ultimately was able to impose its will on the others, including an often-dismayed Britain. At the time, one senior official at the Bank of England described the deal reached at Bretton Woods as "the greatest blow to Britain next to the war", largely because it underlined the way financial power had moved from the UK to the US.

A devastated Britain had little choice. Two world wars had destroyed the country's principal industries that paid for the importation of half of the nation's food and nearly all its raw materials except coal. The British had no choice but to ask for aid. Not until the United States signed an agreement on 6 December 1945 to grant Britain aid of $4.4 billion did the British Parliament ratify the Bretton Woods Agreements (which occurred later in December 1945).

== Design of the financial system ==
Free trade relied on the free convertibility of currencies. Negotiators at the Bretton Woods conference, fresh from what they perceived as a disastrous experience with floating rates in the 1930s, concluded that major monetary fluctuations could stall the free flow of trade.

The new economic system required an accepted vehicle for investment, trade, and payments. Unlike national economies, however, the international economy lacks a central government that can issue currency and manage its use. In the past this problem had been solved through the gold standard, but the architects of Bretton Woods did not consider this option feasible for the postwar political economy. Instead, they set up a system of fixed exchange rates managed by a series of newly created international institutions using the U.S. dollar (which was a gold standard currency for central banks) as a reserve currency.

=== Informal regimes ===
==== Previous regimes ====
In the 19th and early 20th centuries gold played a key role in international monetary transactions. The gold standard was used to back currencies; the international value of currency was determined by its fixed relationship to gold; gold was used to settle international accounts. The gold standard maintained fixed exchange rates that were seen as desirable because they reduced the risk when trading with other countries.

Imbalances in international trade were theoretically rectified automatically by the gold standard. A country with a deficit would have depleted gold reserves and would thus have to reduce its money supply. The resulting fall in demand would reduce imports and the lowering of prices would boost exports; thus, the deficit would be rectified. Any country experiencing inflation would lose gold and therefore would have a decrease in the amount of money available to spend.

This decrease in the amount of money would act to reduce the inflationary pressure. Supplementing the use of gold in this period was the British pound. Based on the dominant British economy, the pound became a reserve, transaction, and intervention currency. But the pound was not up to the challenge of serving as the primary world currency, given the weakness of the British economy after the Second World War.

The architects of Bretton Woods had conceived of a system wherein exchange rate stability was a prime goal. Yet, in an era of more activist economic policy, governments did not seriously consider permanently fixed rates on the model of the classical gold standard of the 19th century. Gold production was not even sufficient to meet the demands of growing international trade and investment. Further, a sizable share of the world's known gold reserves was located in the Soviet Union, which would later emerge as a Cold War rival to the United States and Western Europe.

The only currency strong enough to meet the rising demands for international currency transactions was the U.S. dollar. The strength of the U.S. economy, the fixed relationship of the dollar to gold ($35 an ounce), and the commitment of the U.S. government to convert dollars into gold at that price made the dollar as good as gold. In fact, the dollar was even better than gold: it earned interest and it was more flexible than gold.

=== Fixed exchange rates ===
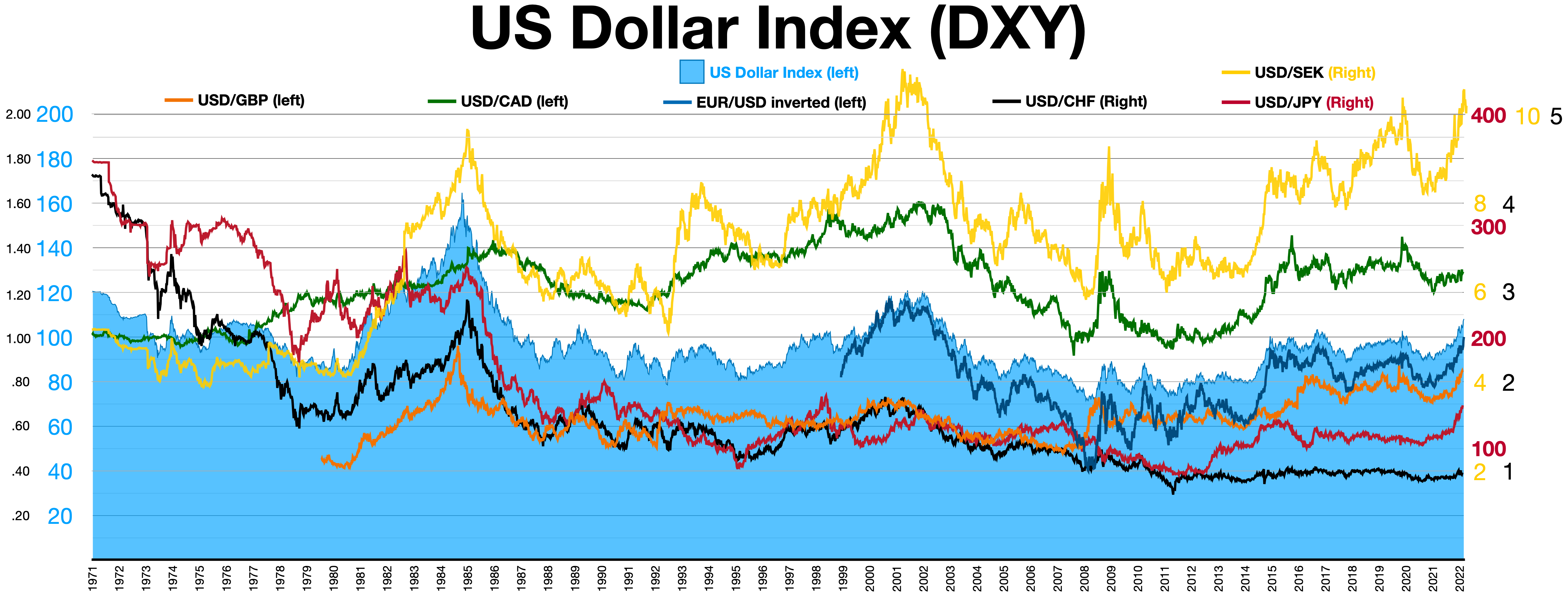
US Dollar Index (DXY) In the early 1970s, this graph shows some currencies at fixed exchange rates before floating against each other: USD/GBP exchange rate USD/CAD exchange rate EUR/USD (inverted) exchange rate USD/JPY exchange rate USD/SEK exchange rate USD/CHF exchange rate

The rules of Bretton Woods, set forth in the articles of agreement of the International Monetary Fund (IMF) and the International Bank for Reconstruction and Development (IBRD), provided for a system of fixed exchange rates. The rules further sought to encourage an open system by committing members to the convertibility of their respective currencies into other currencies and to free trade.

What emerged was the "pegged rate" currency regime. Members were required to establish a parity of their national currencies in terms of the reserve currency (a "peg") and to maintain exchange rates within plus or minus 1% of parity (a "band") by intervening in their foreign exchange markets (that is, buying or selling foreign money).

In theory, the reserve currency would be the bancor (a World Currency Unit that was never implemented), proposed by John Maynard Keynes; however, the United States objected, and their request was granted, making the "reserve currency" the U.S. dollar. This meant that other countries would peg their currencies to the U.S. dollar, and—once convertibility was restored—would buy and sell U.S. dollars to keep market exchange rates within plus or minus 1% of parity. Thus, the U.S. dollar took over the role that gold had played under the gold standard in the international financial system.

Meanwhile, to bolster confidence in the dollar, the U.S. agreed separately to link the dollar to gold at the rate of $35 per ounce (making $1 equal to 13 5/7 grains or 888.67 milligrams). At this rate, foreign governments and central banks could exchange dollars for gold. Bretton Woods established a system of payments based on the dollar, which defined all currencies in relation to the dollar, itself convertible into gold, and above all, "as good as gold" for trade. U.S. currency was now effectively the world currency, the standard to which every other currency was pegged.

The U.S. dollar was the currency with the most purchasing power and it was the only currency that was backed by gold. Additionally, all European states that had been involved in World War II were highly in debt and transferred large amounts of gold into the United States, a fact that contributed to the supremacy of the United States. Thus, the U.S. dollar was strongly appreciated in the rest of the world and therefore became the key currency of the Bretton Woods system.

Member countries could only change their par value by more than 10% with IMF approval, which was contingent on IMF determination that its balance of payments was in a "fundamental disequilibrium". The formal definition of fundamental disequilibrium was never determined, leading to uncertainty of approvals and attempts to repeatedly devalue by less than 10% instead. Any country that changed without approval or after being denied approval was denied access to the IMF.

Maintaining the fixed exchange system required countries to maintain sufficient foreign exchange reserves to intervene in markets and prevent fluctuations away from the pegged rate. This also meant that international movement of capital could not be too large (because that might lead to large fluctuations in the exchange rate and necessitate costly market interventions that risked depleting a country's foreign exchange reserves).

=== Formal regimes ===
The Bretton Woods Conference led to the establishment of the IMF and the IBRD (now the World Bank), which remain powerful forces in the world economy as of the 2020s.

A major point of common ground at the Conference was the goal to avoid a recurrence of the closed markets and economic warfare that had characterized the 1930s. Thus, negotiators at Bretton Woods also agreed that there was a need for an institutional forum for international cooperation on monetary matters. Already in 1944, the British economist John Maynard Keynes emphasized "the importance of rule-based regimes to stabilize business expectations"—something he accepted in the Bretton Woods system of fixed exchange rates. Currency troubles in the interwar years, it was felt, had been greatly exacerbated by the absence of any established procedure or machinery for intergovernmental consultation.

As a result of the establishment of agreed upon structures and rules of international economic interaction, conflict over economic issues was minimized, and the significance of the economic aspect of international relations seemed to recede.

==== International Monetary Fund ====
Officially established on 27 December 1945, when the 29 participating countries at the conference of Bretton Woods signed its Articles of Agreement, the IMF was to be the keeper of the rules and the main instrument of public international management. The Fund commenced its financial operations on 1 March 1947. IMF approval was necessary for any change in exchange rates in excess of 10%. It advised countries on policies affecting the monetary system and lent reserve currencies to countries that had incurred balance of payment debts.

===== Design =====
The big question at the Bretton Woods conference with respect to the institution that would emerge as the IMF was the issue of future access to international liquidity and whether that source should be akin to a world central bank able to create new reserves at will or a more limited borrowing mechanism.

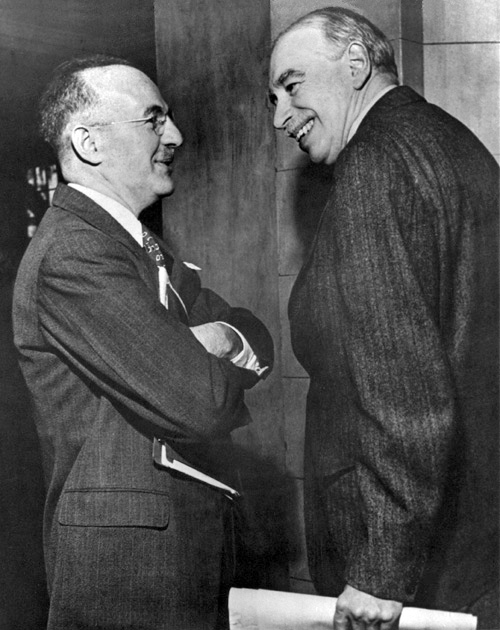
John Maynard Keynes (right) and Harry Dexter White at the inaugural meeting of the International Monetary Fund's Board of Governors in Savannah, Georgia, U.S., 8 March 1946

Although attended by 44 governments, discussions at the conference were dominated by two rival plans developed by the United States and Britain. Writing to the British Treasury, Keynes, who took the lead at the Conference, did not want many countries. He believed that those from the colonies and semi-colonies had "nothing to contribute and will merely encumber the ground".

As the chief international economist at the U.S. Treasury in 1942–44, Harry Dexter White drafted the U.S. blueprint for international access to liquidity, which competed with the plan drafted for the British Treasury by Keynes. Overall, White's scheme tended to favor incentives designed to create price stability within the world's economies, while Keynes wanted a system that encouraged economic growth. The "collective agreement was an enormous international undertaking" that took two years prior to the conference to prepare for. It consisted of numerous bilateral and multilateral meetings to reach common ground on what policies would make up the Bretton Woods system.

At the time, gaps between the White and Keynes plans seemed enormous. White basically wanted a fund to reverse destabilizing flows of financial capital automatically. White proposed a new monetary institution called the Stabilization Fund that "would be funded with a finite pool of national currencies and gold… that would effectively limit the supply of reserve credit". Keynes wanted incentives for the U.S. to help Britain and the rest of Europe rebuild after WWII. Outlining the difficulty of creating a system that every nation could accept in his speech at the closing plenary session of the Bretton Woods conference on 22 July 1944, Keynes stated:

We, the delegates of this Conference, Mr President, have been trying to accomplish something very difficult to accomplish.[...] It has been our task to find a common measure, a common standard, a common rule acceptable to each and not irksome to any.

— The Collected Writings of John Maynard Keynes (Note: Comments by John Maynard Keynes in his speech at the closing plenary session of the Bretton Woods Conference on 22 July 1944 in Donald Moggeridge (ed.), The Collected Writings of John Maynard Keynes (London: Cambridge University Press, 1980), vol. 26, p. 101. This comment also can be found quoted online at)

Keynes' proposals would have established a world reserve currency (which he thought might be called "bancor") administered by a central bank vested with the power to create money and with the authority to take actions on a much larger scale.

In the case of balance of payments imbalances, Keynes recommended that both debtors and creditors should change their policies. As outlined by Keynes, countries with payment surpluses should increase their imports from the deficit countries, build factories in debtor countries, or donate to them—and thereby create a foreign trade equilibrium. Thus, Keynes was sensitive to the problem that placing too much of the burden on the deficit country would be deflationary.

But the United States, as a likely creditor nation, and eager to take on the role of the world's economic powerhouse, used White's plan but targeted many of Keynes's concerns. White saw a role for global intervention in an imbalance only when it was caused by currency speculation.

Although a compromise was reached on some points, because of the overwhelming economic and military power of the United States the participants at Bretton Woods largely agreed on White's plan. White's plan was designed not merely to secure the rise and world economic domination of the United States, but to ensure that as the outgoing superpower Britain would be shuffled even further from centre stage.

===== Subscriptions and quotas =====
What emerged largely reflected U.S. preferences: a system of subscriptions and quotas embedded in the IMF, which itself was to be no more than a fixed pool of national currencies and gold subscribed by each country, as opposed to a world central bank capable of creating money. The Fund was charged with managing various countries' trade deficits so that they would not produce currency devaluations that would trigger a decline in imports.

The IMF is provided with a fund composed of contributions from member countries in gold and their own currencies. The original quotas were to total $8.8 billion. When joining the IMF, members are assigned "quotas" that reflect their relative economic power—and, as a sort of credit deposit, are obliged to pay a "subscription" of an amount commensurate with the quota. They pay the subscription as 25% in gold or currency convertible into gold (effectively the dollar, which at the founding, was the only currency then still directly gold convertible for central banks) and 75% in their own currency.

Quota subscriptions form the largest source of money at the IMF's disposal. The IMF set out to use this money to grant loans to member countries with financial difficulties. Each member is then entitled to withdraw 25% of its quota immediately in case of payment problems. If this sum should be insufficient, each nation in the system is also able to request loans for foreign currency.

===== Trade deficits =====
In the event of a deficit in the current account, Fund members, when short of reserves, would be able to borrow foreign currency in amounts determined by the size of its quota. In other words, the higher the country's contribution was, the higher the sum of money it could borrow from the IMF.

Members were required to pay back debts within a period of 18 months to five years. In turn, the IMF embarked on setting up rules and procedures to keep a country from going too deeply into debt year after year. The Fund would exercise "surveillance" over other economies for the U.S. Treasury in return for its loans to prop up national currencies.

IMF loans were not comparable to loans issued by a conventional credit institution. Instead, they were effectively a chance to purchase a foreign currency with gold or the member's national currency.

The U.S.-backed IMF plan sought to end restrictions on the transfer of goods and services from one country to another, eliminate currency blocs, and lift currency exchange controls.

The IMF was designed to advance credits to countries with balance of payments deficits. Short-run balance of payment difficulties would be overcome by IMF loans, which would facilitate stable currency exchange rates. This flexibility meant a member state would not have to induce a depression to cut its national income down to such a low level that its imports would finally fall within its means. Thus, countries were to be spared the need to resort to the classical medicine of deflating themselves into drastic unemployment when faced with chronic balance of payments deficits. Before the Second World War, European governments—particularly Britain—often resorted to this.

===== Par value =====
The IMF sought to provide for occasional discontinuous exchange-rate adjustments (changing a member's par value) by international agreement. Member states were permitted to adjust their currency exchange rate by 1%. This tended to restore equilibrium in their trade by expanding their exports and contracting imports. This would be allowed only if there was a fundamental disequilibrium. A decrease in the value of a country's money was called a devaluation, while an increase in the value of the country's money was called a revaluation.

It was envisioned that these changes in exchange rates would be quite rare. However, the concept of fundamental disequilibrium, though key to the operation of the par value system, was never defined in detail.

===== Operations =====
Never before had international monetary cooperation been attempted on a permanent institutional basis. Even more groundbreaking was the decision to allocate voting rights among governments, not on a one-state one-vote basis, but rather in proportion to quotas. Since the United States was contributing the most, U.S. leadership was the key. Under the system of weighted voting, the United States exerted a preponderant influence on the IMF. The United States held one-third of all IMF quotas at the outset, enough on its own to veto all changes to the IMF Charter.

In addition, the IMF was based in Washington, D.C., and staffed mainly by U.S. economists. It regularly exchanged personnel with the U.S. Treasury. When the IMF began operations in 1946, President Harry S. Truman named White as its first U.S. Executive Director. Since no Deputy Managing Director post had yet been created, White served occasionally as Acting Managing Director and generally played a highly influential role during the IMF's first year. Truman had to abandon his original plan of naming White as IMF Executive Director when FBI Director J. Edgar Hoover submitted a report to the president, asserting that White was "a valuable adjunct to an underground Soviet espionage organization", who was placing individuals of high regard to Soviet intelligence inside the government.

==== International Bank for Reconstruction and Development ====
The agreement made no provisions to create international reserves. It assumed new gold production would be sufficient. In the event of structural disequilibria, it expected that there would be national solutions, for example, an adjustment in the value of the currency or an improvement by other means of a country's competitive position. The IMF was left with few means, however, to encourage such national solutions.

Economists and other planners recognized in 1944 that the new system could only commence after a return to normality following the disruption of World War II. It was expected that after a brief transition period of no more than five years, the international economy would recover, and the system would enter into operation.

To promote growth of world trade and finance postwar reconstruction of Europe, the planners at Bretton Woods created another institution, the International Bank for Reconstruction and Development (IBRD), which is one of five agencies that make up the World Bank Group and is perhaps now the most important agency of the Group. The IBRD had an authorized capitalization of $10 billion and was expected to make loans of its own funds to underwrite private loans and to issue securities to raise new funds to make possible a speedy postwar recovery. The IBRD was to be a specialized agency of the United Nations, charged with making loans for economic development purposes.

== Application and readjustment ==
=== Dollar shortages and the Marshall Plan ===
The Bretton Woods arrangements were largely adhered to and ratified by the participating governments. It was expected that national monetary reserves, supplemented with necessary IMF credits, would finance any temporary balance of payments disequilibria. But this did not prove sufficient to get Europe out of its conundrum.

Postwar world capitalism suffered from a dollar shortage. The United States was running large balance of trade surpluses, and U.S. reserves were immense and growing. It was necessary to reverse this flow. Even though all countries wanted to buy U.S. exports, dollars had to leave the United States and become available for international use so they could do so. In other words, the United States would have to reverse the imbalances in global wealth by running a balance of trade deficit, financed by an outflow of U.S. reserves to other countries (a U.S. financial account deficit). The U.S. could run a financial deficit by either importing from, building plants in, or donating to foreign countries. Speculative investment was discouraged by the Bretton Woods agreement, and importing from other locations was not appealing in the 1950s, because U.S. technology was cutting edge at the time. So, multinational corporations and global aid that originated from the U.S. burgeoned.

The modest credit facilities of the IMF were clearly insufficient to deal with Western Europe's huge balance of payments deficits. The problem was further aggravated by the reaffirmation by the IMF Board of Governors of the provision in the Bretton Woods Articles of Agreement that the IMF could make loans only for current account deficits and not for capital and reconstruction purposes. Only the United States contribution of $570 million was actually available for IBRD lending. In addition, because the only available market for IBRD bonds was the conservative Wall Street banking market, the IBRD was forced to adopt a conservative lending policy, granting loans only when repayment was assured. Given these problems, by 1947 the IMF and the IBRD themselves were admitting that they could not deal with the international monetary system's economic problems.

The United States set up the European Recovery Program (Marshall Plan) to provide large-scale financial and economic aid for rebuilding Europe largely through grants rather than loans. Countries belonging to the Soviet bloc, e.g., Poland were invited to receive the grants, but were given a favorable agreement with the Soviet Union's COMECON. In a speech at Harvard University on 5 June 1947, U.S. Secretary of State George Marshall stated:

The breakdown of the business structure of Europe during the war was complete. … Europe's requirements for the next three or four years of foreign food and other essential products … principally from the United States … are so much greater than her present ability to pay that she must have substantial help or face economic, social and political deterioration of a very grave character.

— "Against Hunger, Poverty, Desperation and Chaos" (Note: Comments by U.S. Secretary of State George Marshall in his June 1947 speech "Against Hunger, Poverty, Desperation and Chaos" at a Harvard University commencement ceremony. A full transcript of his speech can be read online at)

From 1947 until 1958, the U.S. deliberately encouraged an outflow of dollars, and, from 1950 on, the United States ran a balance of payments deficit with the intent of providing liquidity for the international economy. Dollars flowed out through various U.S. aid programs: the Truman Doctrine entailing aid to the pro-U.S. Greek and Turkish regimes, which were struggling to suppress communist revolution, aid to various pro-U.S. regimes in the Third World, and most importantly, the Marshall Plan. From 1948 to 1954 the United States provided 16 Western European countries with $17 billion in grants.

To encourage long-term adjustment, the United States promoted European and Japanese trade competitiveness. Policies for economic controls on the defeated former Axis countries were scrapped. Aid to Europe and Japan was designed to rebuild productivity and export capacity. In the long run it was expected that such European and Japanese recovery would benefit the United States by widening markets for U.S. exports and providing locations for U.S. capital expansion.

=== Cold War ===
In 1945, Roosevelt and Churchill prepared the postwar era by negotiating with Joseph Stalin at Yalta about respective zones of influence; this same year Germany was divided into four occupation zones (Soviet, American, British, and French).

Roosevelt and Henry Morgenthau insisted that the Big Five (United States, United Kingdom, France, the Soviet Union, and China) participate in the Bretton Woods conference in 1944, but their plans were frustrated when the Soviet Union would not join the IMF. The reasons why the Soviet Union chose not to subscribe to the articles by December 1945 have been the subject of speculation.

Facing the Soviet Union, whose power had also strengthened and whose territorial influence had expanded, the U.S. assumed the role of leader of the capitalist camp. The rise of the postwar U.S. as the world's leading industrial, monetary, and military power was rooted in the fact that the mainland U.S. was untouched by the war, in the instability of the nation states of postwar Europe, and the wartime devastation of the Soviet and European economies.

Despite the economic cost implied by such a policy, being at the center of the international market gave the U.S. unprecedented freedom of action in pursuing its foreign affairs goals. A trade surplus made it easier to keep armies abroad and to invest outside the U.S., and because other countries could not sustain foreign deployments, the U.S. had the power to decide why, when and how to intervene in global crises. The dollar continued to function as a compass to guide the health of the world economy and exporting to the U.S. became the primary economic goal of developing or redeveloping economies. This arrangement came to be referred to as the Pax Americana, in analogy to the Pax Britannica of the late 19th century, the Pax Francica of the 17/18th centuries, the Pax Hispanica of the 16th century and the Pax Romana of the first. (See Globalism)

=== U.S. balance of payments crisis ===
After the end of World War II, the U.S. held $26 billion in gold reserves, of an estimated total of $40 billion (approx 65%). As world trade increased rapidly through the 1950s, the size of the gold base increased by only a few percentage points. In 1950, the U.S. balance of payments swung negative. The first U.S. response to the crisis was in the late 1950s when the Eisenhower administration placed import quotas on oil and other restrictions on trade outflows. More drastic measures were proposed, but not acted upon. However, with a mounting recession that began in 1958, this response alone was not sustainable. In 1960, with Kennedy's election, a decade-long effort to maintain the Bretton Woods System at the $35/ounce price began.

The design of the Bretton Woods System was such that countries could only enforce convertibility to gold for the anchor currency—the United States dollar. Conversion of dollars to gold was allowed but was not required. Governments could forgo converting dollars to gold, and instead hold dollars. Rather than full convertibility, the system provided a fixed price for sales between central banks. However, there was still an open gold market. For the Bretton Woods system to remain workable, it would either have to alter the peg of the dollar to gold, or it would have to maintain the free market price for gold near the $35 per ounce official price. The greater the gap between free market gold prices and central bank gold prices, the greater the temptation to deal with internal economic issues by buying gold at the Bretton Woods price and selling it on the open market.

In 1960 Robert Triffin, a Belgian-American economist, noticed that holding dollars was more valuable than gold because constant U.S. balance of payments deficits helped to keep the system liquid and fuel economic growth. What would later come to be known as Triffin's Dilemma was predicted when Triffin noted that if the U.S. failed to keep running deficits the system would lose its liquidity, not be able to keep up with the world's economic growth, and, thus, bring the system to a halt. But incurring such payment deficits also meant that, over time, the deficits would erode confidence in the dollar as the reserve currency created instability.

The first effort was the creation of the London Gold Pool on 1 November 1961 between eight governments. The theory behind the pool was that spikes in the free market price of gold, set by the morning gold fix in London, could be controlled by having a pool of gold to sell on the open market, that would then be recovered when the price of gold dropped. Gold's price spiked in response to events such as the Cuban Missile Crisis, and other less significant events, to as high as $40/ounce. The Kennedy administration drafted a radical change of the tax system to spur more production capacity and thus encourage exports. This culminated with the 1964 tax cut program, designed to maintain the $35 peg.

In 1967, there was an attack on the pound and a run on gold in the sterling area, and on 18 November 1967, the British government was forced to devalue the pound. U.S. President Lyndon Baines Johnson was faced with a difficult choice, either institute protectionist measures, including travel taxes, export subsidies and slashing the budget—or accept the risk of a "run on gold" and the dollar. From Johnson's perspective: "The world supply of gold is insufficient to make the present system workable—particularly as the use of the dollar as a reserve currency is essential to create the required international liquidity to sustain world trade and growth."

While West Germany agreed not to purchase gold from the U.S., and agreed to hold dollars instead, the pressure on both the dollar and the pound sterling continued. In January 1968 Johnson imposed a series of measures designed to end gold outflow, and to increase U.S. exports. This was unsuccessful, however, as in mid-March 1968 a dollar run on gold ensued through the free market in London, the London Gold Pool was dissolved, initially by the institution of ad hoc UK bank holidays at the request of the U.S. government. This was followed by a full closure of the London gold market, also at the request of the U.S. government, until a series of meetings were held that attempted to rescue or reform the existing system.

All attempts to maintain the peg collapsed in November 1968, and a new policy program attempted to convert the Bretton Woods system into an enforcement mechanism of floating the gold peg, which would be set by either fiat policy or by a restriction to honor foreign accounts. The collapse of the gold pool and the refusal of the pool members to trade gold with private entities—on 18 March 1968 the Congress of the United States repealed the 25% requirement of gold backing of the dollar—as well as the U.S. pledge to suspend gold sales to governments that trade in the private markets, led to the expansion of the private markets for international gold trade, in which the price of gold rose much higher than the official dollar price. U.S. gold reserves remained depleted due to the actions of some countries, notably France, which continued to build up their own gold reserves.

== Change and decline ==
=== Return to convertibility ===
In the 1960s and 1970s, important structural changes eventually led to the breakdown of international monetary management. One change was the development of a high level of monetary interdependence. The stage was set for monetary interdependence by the return to convertibility of the Western European currencies at the end of 1958 and of the Japanese yen in 1964. Convertibility facilitated the vast expansion of international financial transactions, which deepened monetary interdependence.

The Eurodollar market grew from zero before 1957 to $80 billion in 1972. Euromarkets increased international credit, liquidity, and volatility. Capital flows began to dwarf domestic and international efforts to regulate capital movements.

=== Growth of international currency markets ===
Another aspect of the internationalization of banking has been the emergence of international banking consortia. Since 1964 various banks had formed international syndicates, and by 1971 over three-quarters of the world's largest banks had become shareholders in such syndicates. Multinational banks can and do make large international transfers of capital not only for investment purposes but also for hedging and speculating against exchange rate fluctuations.

These new forms of monetary interdependence made large capital flows possible. During the Bretton Woods era, countries were reluctant to alter exchange rates formally even in cases of structural disequilibria. Because such changes had a direct impact on certain domestic economic groups, they came to be seen as political risks for leaders. As a result, official exchange rates often became unrealistic in market terms, providing a virtually risk-free temptation for speculators. They could move from a weak to a strong currency hoping to reap profits when a revaluation occurred. If, however, monetary authorities managed to avoid revaluation, they could return to other currencies with no loss. The combination of risk-free speculation with the availability of large sums was highly destabilizing.

=== U.S. monetary influence ===
A second structural change that undermined monetary management was the decline of U.S. hegemony. The U.S. was no longer the dominant economic power it had been for more than two decades. By the mid-1960s, the E.E.C. and Japan had become international economic powers in their own right. With total reserves exceeding those of the U.S., higher levels of growth and trade, and per capita income approaching that of the U.S., Europe and Japan were narrowing the gap between themselves and the United States.

The shift toward a more pluralistic distribution of economic power led to increasing dissatisfaction with the privileged role of the U.S. dollar as the international currency. Acting effectively as the world's central banker, the U.S., through its deficit, determined the level of international liquidity. In an increasingly interdependent world, U.S. policy significantly influenced economic conditions in Europe and Japan. In addition, as long as other countries were willing to hold dollars, the U.S. could carry out massive foreign expenditures for political purposes—military activities and foreign aid—without the threat of balance-of-payments constraints.

Dissatisfaction with the political implications of the dollar system was increased by détente between the U.S. and the Soviet Union. The Soviet military threat had been an important force in cementing the U.S.-led monetary system. The U.S. political and security umbrella helped make American economic domination palatable for Europe and Japan, which had been economically exhausted by the war. As gross domestic production grew in European countries, trade grew. When common security tensions lessened, this loosened the transatlantic dependence on defence concerns, and allowed latent economic tensions to surface.

=== Dollar ===
Reinforcing the relative decline in U.S. power and the dissatisfaction of Europe and Japan with the system was the continuing decline of the dollar—the foundation that had underpinned the post-1945 global trading system. The Vietnam War and the refusal of the administration of U.S. President Lyndon B. Johnson to pay for it and his Great Society programs through taxation resulted in an increased dollar outflow to pay for the military expenditures and rampant inflation, which led to the deterioration of the U.S. balance of trade position. In the late 1960s, the dollar was overvalued with its current trading position, while the German Mark and the yen were undervalued; and, naturally, the Germans and the Japanese had no desire to revalue and thereby make their exports more expensive, whereas the U.S. sought to maintain its international credibility by avoiding devaluation. Meanwhile, the pressure on government reserves was intensified by the new international currency markets, with their vast pools of speculative capital moving around in search of quick profits.

In contrast, upon the creation of Bretton Woods, with the U.S. producing half of the world's manufactured goods and holding half its reserves, the twin burdens of international management and the Cold War were possible to meet at first. Throughout the 1950s Washington sustained a balance of payments deficit to finance loans, aid, and troops for allied regimes. But during the 1960s the costs of doing so became less tolerable. By 1970 the U.S. held under 16% of international reserves. Adjustment to these changed realities was impeded by the U.S. commitment to fixed exchange rates and by the U.S. obligation to convert dollars into gold on demand.

=== Floating-rate system during 1968–1972 ===
By 1968, the attempt to defend the dollar at a fixed peg of $35/ounce, the policy of the Eisenhower, Kennedy and Johnson administrations, had become increasingly untenable. Gold outflows from the U.S. accelerated, and despite gaining assurances from Germany and other countries to hold gold, the unbalanced spending of the Johnson administration had transformed the dollar shortage of the 1940s and 1950s into a dollar glut by the 1960s. In 1967, the IMF agreed in Rio de Janeiro to replace the tranche division set up in 1946. Special drawing rights (SDRs) were set as equal to one U.S. dollar but were not usable for transactions other than between banks and the IMF. Governments were required to accept holding SDRs equal to three times their allotment, and interest would be charged, or credited, to each nation based on their SDR holding. The original interest rate was 1.5%.

The intent of the SDR system was to prevent countries from buying pegged gold and selling it at the higher free market price and give governments a reason to hold dollars by crediting interest, at the same time setting a clear limit to the amount of dollars that could be held.

== The end of the system ==
=== Nixon shock ===
A negative balance of payments, growing public debt incurred by the Vietnam War and Great Society programs, and monetary inflation by the Federal Reserve caused the dollar to become increasingly overvalued. The drain on U.S. gold reserves culminated with the London Gold Pool collapse in March 1968. By 1970, the U.S. had seen its gold coverage deteriorate from 55% to 22%. This, in the view of neoclassical economists, represented the point where holders of the dollar had lost faith in the ability of the U.S. to cut budget and trade deficits.

In 1971 more and more dollars were being printed in Washington, then being pumped overseas, to pay for government expenditure on the military and social programs. In the first six months of 1971, assets for $22 billion fled the U.S. In response, on 15 August 1971, Nixon issued Executive Order 11615 pursuant to the Economic Stabilization Act of 1970, unilaterally imposing 90-day wage and price controls, a 10% import surcharge, and most importantly "closed the gold window", making the dollar inconvertible to gold directly, except on the open market. Unusually, this decision was made without consulting members of the international monetary system or even his own State Department and was soon dubbed the "Nixon Shock".

=== Smithsonian Agreement ===
Gold prices (US$ per troy ounce) with a line approximately marking the collapse of Bretton Woods

The August shock was followed by efforts under U.S. leadership to reform the international monetary system. Throughout the fall (autumn) of 1971, a series of multilateral and bilateral negotiations between the Group of Ten countries took place, seeking to redesign the exchange rate regime.

Meeting in December 1971 at the Smithsonian Institution in Washington, D.C., the Group of Ten signed the Smithsonian Agreement. The U.S. pledged to peg the dollar at $38/ounce with 2.25% trading bands, and other countries agreed to appreciate their currencies versus the dollar. The group also planned to balance the world financial system using special drawing rights alone.

The agreement failed to encourage discipline by the Federal Reserve or the United States government. The Federal Reserve was concerned about an increase in the domestic unemployment rate due to the devaluation of the dollar. In an attempt to undermine the efforts of the Smithsonian Agreement, the Federal Reserve lowered interest rates in pursuit of a previously established domestic policy objective of full national employment. With the Smithsonian Agreement, member countries anticipated a return flow of dollars to the U.S., but the reduced interest rates within the United States caused dollars to continue to flow out of the U.S. and into foreign central banks. The inflow of dollars into foreign banks continued the monetization of the dollar overseas, defeating the aims of the Smithsonian Agreement.

Virtual collapse of Bretton Woods system in 1972 led to the Committee on Reform of the International Monetary System and Issues, tasked with advising on international monetary reform. The dollar price in the gold free market continued to cause pressure on its official rate; soon after a 10% devaluation was announced in February 1973, Japan and the EEC countries decided to let their currencies float. This proved to be the beginning of the collapse of the Bretton Woods System. The end of Bretton Woods was formally ratified by the Jamaica Accords in 1976. By the early 1980s, all industrialised states were using floating currencies.

== In the 21st century ==
=== 2008 financial crisis ===
During the 2008 financial crisis, some policymakers, such as James Chace and others called for a new international monetary system that some of them also dub Bretton Woods II.

On 26 September 2008, French President Nicolas Sarkozy said, "we must rethink the financial system from scratch, as at Bretton Woods."

In March 2010, Prime Minister Papandreou of Greece wrote an op-ed in the International Herald Tribune, in which he said, "Democratic governments worldwide must establish a new global financial architecture, as bold in its own way as Bretton Woods, as bold as the creation of the European Community and European Monetary Union. And we need it fast." In interviews coinciding with his meeting with President Obama, he indicated that Obama would raise the issue of new regulations for the international financial markets at the next G20 meetings in June and November 2010.

Over the course of the crisis, the IMF progressively relaxed its stance on "free-market" principles such as its guidance against using capital controls. In 2011, the IMF's managing director Dominique Strauss-Kahn stated that boosting employment and equity "must be placed at the heart" of the IMF's policy agenda. The World Bank indicated a switch towards greater emphases on job creation.

=== 2020 crisis ===
Following the 2020 Economic Recession, the managing director of the IMF announced the emergence of "A New Bretton Woods Moment" which outlines the need for coordinated fiscal response on the part of central banks around the world to address the ongoing economic crisis.

== Impact and criticism ==
The Bretton Woods system played a key role in shaping the postwar global economy, but its structure also led to significant challenges. While it initially provided monetary stability and facilitated economic growth, it placed a heavy reliance on the U.S. dollar as the central reserve currency. This gave the United States considerable influence over the international financial system and allowed it to run persistent trade and budget deficits with fewer immediate consequences than other nations faced. Fixed exchange rates, a defining feature of the system, provided stability but also limited the flexibility of national governments to respond to economic shifts, sometimes leading to economic strain.

As global trade expanded, maintaining the system became increasingly difficult. Rising inflation and growing U.S. trade deficits in the 1960s created tensions, particularly among European nations and Japan, which sought more control over their monetary policies. The system's collapse in the early 1970s led to the widespread adoption of floating exchange rates, marking a significant shift in global finance. The institutions created under Bretton Woods, particularly the International Monetary Fund (IMF) and the World Bank, have also been the subject of ongoing debate. Critics argue that these institutions, while intended to promote global financial stability and development, have often imposed loan conditions that disproportionately burden developing nations. The World Bank has faced scrutiny for funding projects linked to environmental and social disruptions, while the IMF has been criticized for enforcing austerity measures that some argue have deepened economic crises rather than alleviated them. Critics also note that the IMF prioritizes the stability of financial institutions over individual economic freedoms, restricting the ability of local markets to self-correct and develop organically.

The system's collapse also contributed to broader discussions on alternative monetary arrangements. Some economists and policymakers have advocated for a return to a commodity-backed system, while others have proposed a global reserve currency independent of any single nation, similar to Keynes' earlier concept of the "Bancor." More recently, decentralized financial systems, including Bitcoin and other cryptocurrencies, have been suggested as alternatives to government-controlled monetary systems, with proponents arguing that they offer a way to reduce reliance on centralized institutions. While no single system has replaced Bretton Woods, its legacy continues to shape debates over global financial stability and monetary policy.

== Pegged rates ==
Dates are those when the rate was introduced; "*" indicates floating rate mostly taken prior to the introduction of the euro on 1 January 1999.

=== Japanese yen ===
Date	# yen = $1 US	# yen = £1
August 1946	15	60.45
12 March 1947	50	201.5
5 July 1948	270	1,088.1
25 April 1949	360	1,450.8
18 September 1949	360	1,008
17 November 1967	360	864
20 July 1971	308	739.2
31 December 1998	112.77*	187.65*

=== Deutschmark ===
Date	# Mark = $1 US	# Mark = £1
21 June 1948	3.33	13.42
18 September 1949	4.20	11.76
6 March 1961	4.00	11.20
November 1967	4.00	9.60
29 October 1969	3.67	8.81
31 December 1998	1.6665*	2.773*

Note: Converted to euro on 1 January 1999 at €1 = DM 1.95583.

=== Pound sterling ===
Date	# US$ = £1	# pounds = $1 US	pre-decimal value of $1 US
27 December 1945	4.03	0.2481	4 shillings and 11 1/2 pence
18 September 1949	2.80	0.3571	7 shillings and 1 3/4 pence
17 November 1967	2.40	0.4167	8 shillings and 4 pence
31 December 1998	1.664*	0.601*	

Note: pre-decimal values in 1945 and 1949 are approximated to the nearest quarter of a penny, the smallest denomination that was legal tender. The 1967 pre-decimal equivalent is exact.

=== French franc ===
Date	# FRF = $1 US	# FRF = £1
27 December 1945	1.1911	4.80
26 January 1948	2.1439	8.64
18 October 1948	2.6352	10.62
27 April 1949	2.7221	10.97
20 September 1949	3.50	9.80
11 August 1957	4.20	11.76
27 December 1958	4.9371	13.82
17 November 1967	4.9371	11.76
10 August 1969	5.55	13.32
31 December 1998	5.5889*	9.30*

Note: Converted to euro on 1 January 1999 at €1 = FRF 6.55957. Values prior to the currency reform of 1 January 1960 are shown in new francs or FRF worth 100 old francs.

=== Italian lira ===
Date	# lire = $1 US
4 January 1946	225
26 March 1946	509
7 January 1947	350
28 November 1947	575
18 September 1949	625
31 December 1998	1,649.87*

Note: Converted to euro on 1 January 1999 at €1 = 1,936.27 lire.

=== Spanish peseta ===
Date	# pesetas = $1 US	# pesetas = £1
17 July 1959	60	168
20 November 1967	70	168
31 December 1998	141.76*	235.89*

Note: Converted to euro on 1 January 1999 at €1 = 166.386 pesetas.

=== Dutch guilder ===
Date	# gulden = $1 US
27 December 1945	2.652
20 September 1949	3.80
7 March 1961	3.62
31 December 1998	1.8777*

Note: Converted to euro on 1 January 1999 at €1 = 2.20371 gulden.

=== Belgian franc ===
Date	# francs = $1 US	# francs = £1
27 December 1945	43.77	176.39
1946	43.8725	176.81
21 September 1949	50.00	140.00
November 1967	50.00	120.00
31 December 1998	34.37*	57.19*

Note: Converted to euro on 1 January 1999 at €1 = 40.3399 Belgian francs.

=== Swiss franc ===
Date	# francs = $1 US	# francs = £1
27 December 1945	4.373	17.62
September 1949	4.373	12.24
17 November 1967	4.373	10.50
31 December 1998	1.374*	2.286*

=== Greek drachma ===
Date	# drachmae = $1 US
1954	30.00
29 December 2000	363.28*

Note: Converted to euro on 1 January 2001 at €1 = 340.75 drachmae.

=== Danish krone ===
Date	# kroner = $1 US
August 1945	4.80
19 September 1949	6.91
21 November 1967	7.50
31 December 1998	6.347*

=== Finnish markka ===
Date	# FIM = $1 US	# FIM = £1
17 October 1945	1.36	5.48
5 July 1949	1.60	6.45
19 September 1949	2.30	6.44
15 September 1957	3.20	8.96
12 October 1967	4.20	11.20
17 November 1967	4.20	10.08
30 December 1998	5.066*	8.43*

Note: Converted to euro on 1 January 2000 at €1 = FIM 5.94573. Values prior to the currency reform of 1 January 1963 are shown in new markkaa or FIM worth 100 old markkaa.

=== Norwegian krone ===
Date	# kroner = $1 US	Note
15 September 1946	4.03	Joined Bretton Woods. £1 = 20.00 krone
19 September 1949	7.15	Devalued in line with sterling
15 August 1971	7.016*	Bretton Woods collapsed
21 December 1971	6.745	Joined the Smithsonian Treaty
23 May 1972	6.571	Joined the "European Monetary System"
16 November 1972	6.611*	The Smithsonian Treaty collapsed
12 December 1978	5.096*	Left "European Monetary System", linked to a "basket" of currencies
October 1990	5.920*	Pegged to the ECU
12 December 1992	6.684*	Fully floating

== See also ==
- Bretton Woods Committee
- General Agreement on Tariffs and Trade
- Monetary hegemony and Dedollarisation
- Neoliberalism
  - Washington Consensus

General:

- List of international trade topics
- Foreign exchange reserves
