= World currency =

Currency that is widely used internationally

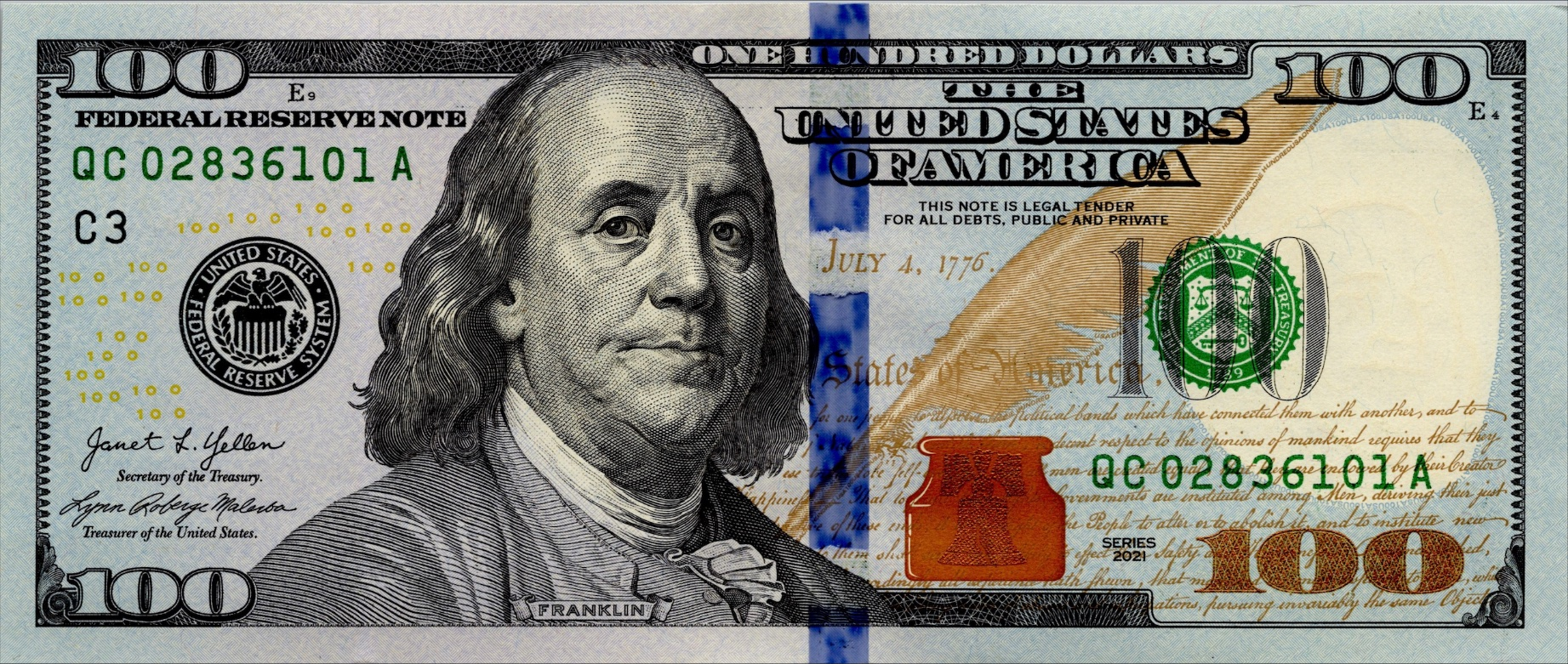

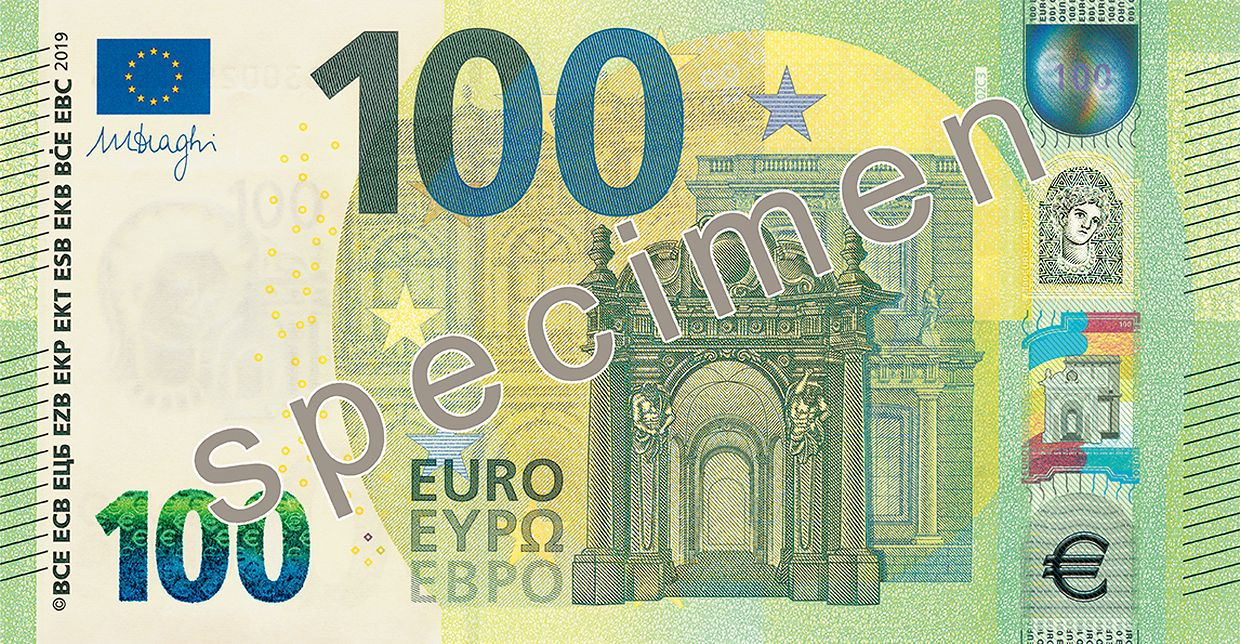
The U.S. dollar (top) and the euro are by far the most used currencies in terms of global reserves.

A world currency, supranational currency, or global currency is a currency that is widely used in international finance or in international trade to price goods or other transactions. It is generally a currency which is stable in terms of inflation and has a high demand on the foreign exchange market. Greek and Roman coins were the first world currency, followed by Dutch guilders in the early 17th century, Spanish dollars through 19th century, and the pound sterling through the early 20th century. The US dollar became the world's principal reserve currency under the Bretton Woods system in 1944. The Bretton Woods gold-convertibility system ended in 1971, and the Jamaica Accords of 1976 formalized the transition to a floating exchange-rate system. The dollar nevertheless remained the dominant global reserve currency and continues to hold that role today.

Following the 2008 financial crisis, there have been international efforts to move away from the US dollar as a reserve currency, slightly reducing its role as world currency. In 2024, the US dollar still accounted for 58% of the world's reserve currencies, while the euro accounted for 20%. The yen, pound sterling, Canadian dollar, Australian dollar and renminbi accounted for the remainder.

Most traded currencies by value Currency distribution of global foreign exchange market turnover
Currency	ISO 4217 code	Proportion of daily volume		Change (2022–2025)
Currency	ISO 4217 code	April 2022	April 2025	Change (2022–2025)
United States dollar	USD	88.4%	89.2%	▲0.8pp
Euro	EUR	30.6%	28.9%	▼1.7pp
Japanese yen	JPY	16.7%	16.8%	▲0.1pp
Pound sterling	GBP	12.9%	10.2%	▼2.7pp
Renminbi	CNY	7.0%	8.5%	▲1.5pp
Swiss franc	CHF	5.2%	6.4%	▲1.2pp
Australian dollar	AUD	6.4%	6.1%	▼0.3pp
Canadian dollar	CAD	6.2%	5.8%	▼0.4pp
Hong Kong dollar	HKD	2.6%	3.8%	▲1.2pp
Singapore dollar	SGD	2.4%	2.4%	Steady
Indian rupee	INR	1.6%	1.9%	▲0.3pp
South Korean won	KRW	1.8%	1.8%	Steady
Swedish krona	SEK	2.2%	1.6%	▼0.6pp
Mexican peso	MXN	1.5%	1.6%	▲0.1pp
New Zealand dollar	NZD	1.7%	1.5%	▼0.2pp
Norwegian krone	NOK	1.7%	1.3%	▼0.4pp
New Taiwan dollar	TWD	1.1%	1.2%	▲0.1pp
Brazilian real	BRL	0.9%	0.9%	Steady
South African rand	ZAR	1.0%	0.8%	▼0.2pp
Polish złoty	PLN	0.7%	0.8%	▲0.1pp
Danish krone	DKK	0.7%	0.7%	Steady
Indonesian rupiah	IDR	0.4%	0.7%	▲0.3pp
Turkish lira	TRY	0.4%	0.5%	▲0.1pp
Thai baht	THB	0.4%	0.5%	▲0.1pp
Israeli new shekel	ILS	0.4%	0.4%	Steady
Hungarian forint	HUF	0.3%	0.4%	▲0.1pp
Czech koruna	CZK	0.4%	0.4%	Steady
Chilean peso	CLP	0.3%	0.3%	Steady
Philippine peso	PHP	0.2%	0.2%	Steady
Colombian peso	COP	0.2%	0.2%	Steady
Malaysian ringgit	MYR	0.2%	0.2%	Steady
UAE dirham	AED	0.4%	0.1%	▼0.3pp
Saudi riyal	SAR	0.2%	0.1%	▼0.1pp
Romanian leu	RON	0.1%	0.1%	Steady
Peruvian sol	PEN	0.1%	0.1%	Steady
Other currencies		2.6%	3.4%	▲0.8pp
Total (Note: The total sum is 200% because each currency trade is counted twice: once for the currency being bought and once for the currency being sold. The percentages above represent the proportion of all trades involving a given currency, regardless of which side of the transaction it is on.)		200.0%	200.0%	

== History ==
According to Barry Eichengreen, Greek and Roman coins were the first world currencies.

=== First European Banknotes (17th century) ===
The first European banknotes were issued in 1661 by Stockholms Banco. Founded by Johan Palmstruch, it was a predecessor of Sweden's central bank Sveriges Riksbank. As commercial activity and trade shifted northward in 17th century Europe, deposits at and notes issued by the Bank of Amsterdam denominated in Dutch guilders became the means of payment for much trade in the western world.

=== Spanish dollar (17th – 19th centuries) ===
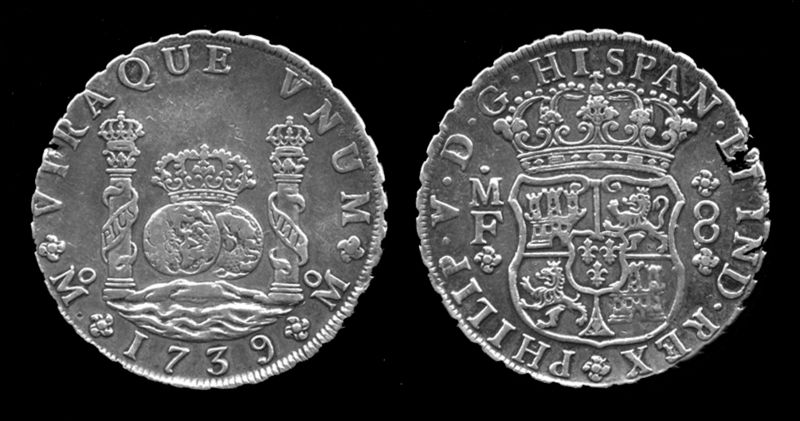
Spanish dollar of Philip V of Spain, 1739

In the 17th and 18th centuries, the use of silver Spanish dollars or eight-real coins, also known as "pieces of eight", extended from the Spanish territories in the Americas westwards to Asia and eastwards to Europe. This then formed the first worldwide currency. Spain's political supremacy on the world stage, the importance of Spanish commercial routes across the Atlantic and the Pacific, and the coin's quality and purity of silver helped it become internationally accepted for about three centuries. It was legal tender in Spain's Pacific territories of Philippines, Guam and Micronesia, and later in China and other Southeast Asian countries, until the mid-19th century. In the Americas it was legal tender in all of South and Central America (except Brazil) and in the US and Canada until the 19th century. The Spanish dollar was legal tender in the United States until the Coinage Act of 1857. In Europe it was legal tender in the Iberian Peninsula, as well as most of Italy including Milan, the Kingdom of Naples, Sicily and Sardinia; in the Franche-Comté (France); and in the Spanish Netherlands. It was also used in other European states including the Austrian Habsburg territories.

After Mexican Independence in 1821, the Spanish dollar continued to be used in many parts of the Americas, together with the Mexican Peso from the 1860s onward. The Mexican peso, the US dollar, and the Canadian dollar all trace their origins back to the Spanish dollar. This also includes the use of the caduceus sign ($), also known as the dollar sign.

=== Sterling ===
Before 1944, the world reference currency was the United Kingdom's sterling. The transition between sterling and United States dollar and its impact for central banks was described recently.

=== U.S. dollar ===
Worldwide use of the euro and the US$ United States External adopters of the US dollar Currencies pegged to the US dollar Currencies pegged to the US dollar w/ narrow band Eurozone External adopters of the euro Currencies pegged to the euro Currencies pegged to the euro w/ narrow band The Belarusian ruble is pegged to the Chinese renminbi, Russian rouble and US dollar in a currency basket; instead of the renminbi it was pegged to the euro until December 2022.

In the period following the Bretton Woods Conference of 1944, exchange rates around the world were pegged to the United States dollar, which could be exchanged for a fixed amount of gold. This reinforced the dominance of the US dollar as a global currency.

Since the collapse of the fixed exchange rate regime and the gold standard and the institution of floating exchange rates following the Smithsonian Agreement in 1971, most currencies around the world have no longer been pegged to the United States dollar. However, as the United States has the world's largest economy, most international transactions continue to be conducted with the United States dollar, and it has remained the de facto world currency. According to Robert Gilpin in Global Political Economy: Understanding the International Economic Order (2001): "Somewhere between 40 and 60 percent of international financial transactions are denominated in dollars. For decades the dollar has also been the world's principal reserve currency; in 1996, the dollar accounted for approximately two-thirds of the world's foreign exchange reserves", as compared to about one-quarter held in euros (see Reserve Currency).

Some of the world's currencies are still pegged to the dollar. Some countries, such as Ecuador, El Salvador, and Panama, have gone even further and eliminated their own currency (see dollarization) in favor of the United States dollar.

Only two serious challengers to the status of the United States dollar as a world currency have arisen. During the 1980s, the Japanese yen became increasingly used as an international currency, but that usage diminished with the Japanese recession in the 1990s. More recently, the euro has increasingly competed with the United States dollar in international finance.

=== Euro ===
The euro inherited its status as a major reserve currency from the German mark (DM) and its contribution to official reserves has increased as banks seek to diversify their reserves and trade in the eurozone expands.

As with the dollar, some of the world's currencies are pegged against the euro. They are usually Eastern European currencies like the Bosnia and Herzegovina convertible mark, plus several west African currencies like the Cape Verdean escudo and the CFA franc. Other European countries, while not being EU members, have adopted the euro due to currency unions with member states, or by unilaterally superseding their own currencies: Andorra, Monaco, Kosovo, Montenegro, San Marino, and Vatican City.

As of December 2006, the euro surpassed the dollar in the combined value of cash in circulation. The value of euro notes in circulation has risen to more than €610 billion, equivalent to US$800 billion at the exchange rates at the time. A 2016 report by the World Trade Organization shows that the world's energy, food and services trade are made 60% with US dollar and 40% by euro.

=== Recent proposals (21st century) ===
==== Governmental ====
- Enlargement (diversification) of the list of currencies used as reserve ones, based on agreed measures to promote the development of major regional financial centers. In this context, we should consider possible establishment of specific regional mechanisms which would contribute to reducing volatility of exchange rates of such reserve currencies.
- Introduction of a supra-national reserve currency to be issued by international financial institutions. It seems appropriate to consider the role of IMF in this process and to review the feasibility of and the need for measures to ensure the recognition of SDRs as a "supra-reserve" currency by the whole world community."

On 23 March 2009, Zhou Xiaochuan, then-President of the People's Bank of China, called for a replacement of the US dollar with a different standard using "creative reform of the existing international monetary system towards an international reserve currency," believing it would "significantly reduce the risks of a future crisis and enhance crisis management capability." Zhou suggested that the IMF's special drawing rights (a currency basket then comprising dollars, euros, sterling and yen) could serve as a super-sovereign reserve currency, saying that it would not be easily influenced by the policies of individual countries. Then-US President Barack Obama, however, rejected China's call for a new global currency. He stated, "As far as confidence in the US economy or the dollar, I would just point out that the dollar is extraordinarily strong right now." At the G8 summit in July 2009, Dmitry Medvedev expressed Russia's desire for a new supranational reserve currency by showing off a coin minted with the words "unity in diversity". The coin, an example of a future world currency, emphasized his call for creating a mix of regional currencies as a way to address the 2008 financial crisis.

On 30 March 2009, at the second South America-Arab League Summit in Qatar, Venezuelan president Hugo Chavez proposed the creation of a petro-currency. It would be backed by the huge oil reserves of oil-producing countries. Chavez's successor, Nicolás Maduro, in 2018 announced the Petro cryptocurrency, but it does not appear to be used as a currency.

== Single world currency ==
An alternative definition of a world or global currency refers to a hypothetical single global currency or supercurrency, as the proposed terra or the DEY (acronym for Dollar Euro Yen), produced and supported by a central bank which is used for all transactions around the world, regardless of the nationality of the entities (individuals, corporations, governments, or other organizations) involved in the transaction. No such official currency currently exists, although non-inflationary current funds such as MXV/UDI (Mexican unidad de inversión) have been used as a model for a General Global Currency (GGC), a principal reserved current fund based on a complex relationship between national currencies.

Advocates, notably Keynes, of a global currency often argue that such a currency would not suffer from inflation, which, in extreme cases, has had disastrous effects for economies. In addition, many argue that a single global currency would make conducting international business more efficient and would encourage foreign direct investment (FDI).

There are many different variations of the idea, including a possibility that it would be administered by a global central bank that would define its own monetary standard or that it would be on the gold standard. Supporters often point to the euro as an example of a supranational currency successfully implemented by a union of nations with disparate languages, cultures, and economies.

A limited alternative would be a world reserve currency issued by the International Monetary Fund, as an evolution of the existing special drawing rights and used as reserve assets by all national and regional central banks. On 26 March 2009, a UN panel of expert economists called for a new global currency reserve scheme to replace the current US dollar-based system. The panel's report pointed out that the "greatly expanded SDR (special drawing rights), with regular or cyclically adjusted emissions calibrated to the size of reserve accumulations, could contribute to global stability, economic strength and global equity."

Another world currency was proposed to use conceptual currency to aid the transaction between countries. The basic idea is to utilize the balance of trade to cancel out the currency actually needed to trade.

In addition to the idea of a single world currency, some evidence suggests the world may evolve multiple global currencies that exchange on a singular market system. The rise of digital global currencies owned by privately held companies or groups such as Ven suggest that multiple global currencies may offer wider formats for trade as they gain strength and wider acceptance.

WOCU currency, based on the WOCU synthetic global currency quotation derived from a weighted basket of currencies of fiat currency pairs covering the top 20 economies of the world, is planned to be issued and distributed by Unite Global a centralised platform for global real-time payments and settlement.

== Difficulties ==
=== Limited additional benefit with extra cost ===
Some economists argue that a single world currency is unnecessary, because the U.S. dollar is providing many of the benefits of a world currency while avoiding some of the costs. However, this de facto situation gives the U.S. government additional power over other countries. If the world does not form an optimum currency area, then it would be economically inefficient for the world to share one currency.

=== Economically incompatible nations ===
In the present world, nations are not able to work together closely enough to be able to produce and support a common currency. There has to be a high level of trust between different countries before a true world currency could be created. A world currency might even undermine national sovereignty of smaller states.

=== Wealth redistribution ===
The interest rate set by the central bank indirectly determines the interest rate customers must pay on their bank loans. This interest rate affects the rate of interest among individuals, investments, and countries. Lending to the poor involves more risk than lending to the rich. As a result of the larger differences in wealth in different areas of the world, a central bank's ability to set interest rates to make the area prosper will be increasingly compromised, since it places wealthiest regions in conflict with the poorest regions in debt.

== See also ==
- Bancor
- Currency substitution
- Dedollarisation
- Nixon shock
- Digital currency
- List of currencies
- List of circulating currencies
- Monetary hegemony
- Special drawing rights (SDRs)
- WOCU
- World currency unit
- Synthetic currency pair
- Trade coin
