= WDX Institute =

Research group studying the synthetic international currency basket, the WOCU

The logo of the WDX Institute.

The WDX Institute is a not-for-profit research body established to further academic research on World Currency Baskets. It is responsible for independently monitoring the Algorithm of the Wocu, a standardized basket of currencies comprising the national currencies of the 20 largest national economies measured by GDP.

== See also ==
- Wocu
- Special drawing rights
- Bancor
- European Currency Unit
- World currency unit
- World currency
