= Jean de Largentaye =

French civil servant and economist

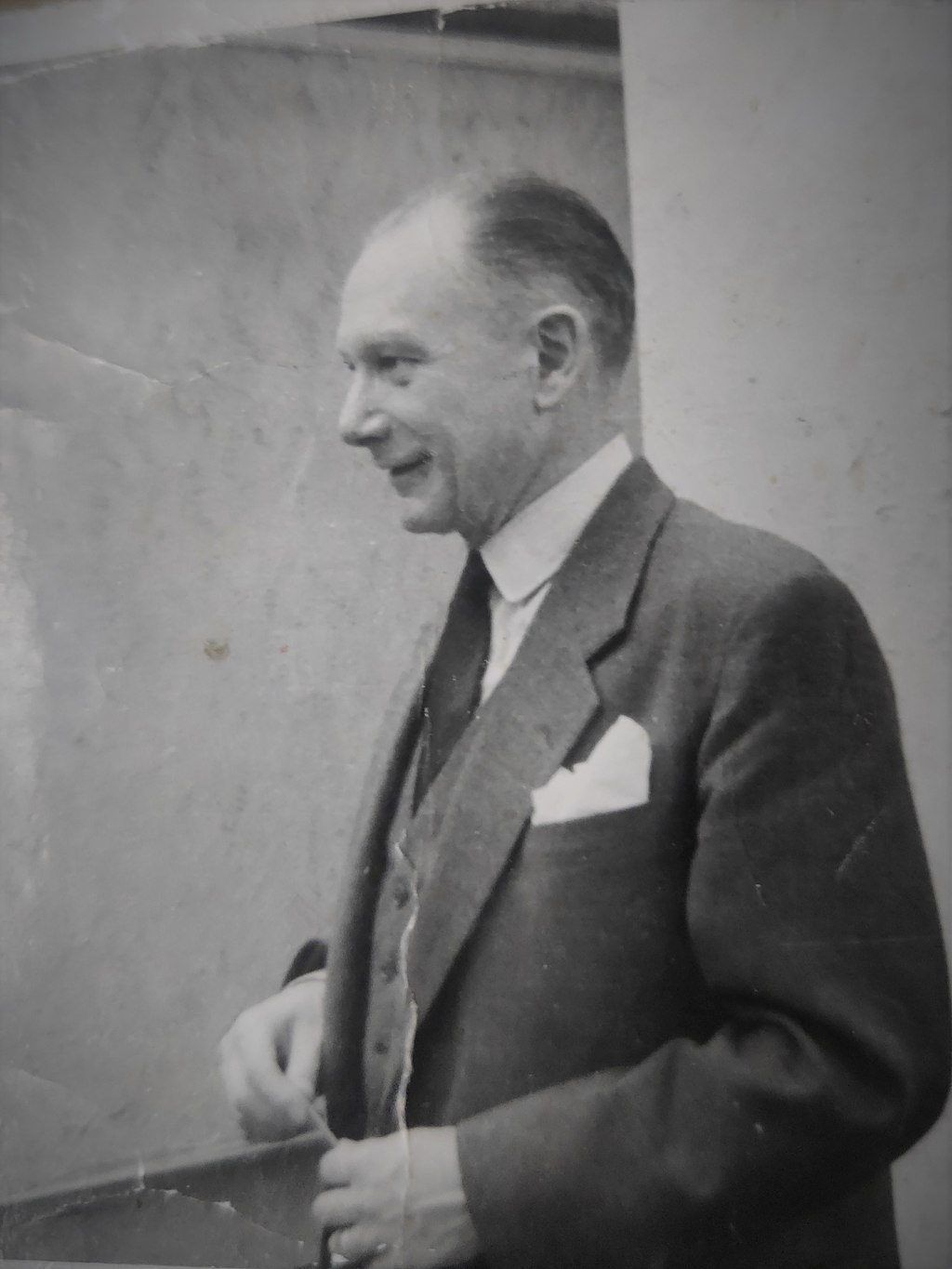
Jean de Largentaye in 1955 in Washington D.C.

Jean de Largentaye (1903–1970) was a French civil servant and economist, translator of John Maynard Keynes's General Theory published in English in 1936 and in French in 1942, and French Executive director at the International Monetary Fund (IMF) from 1946 to 1964.

== Biography ==
=== Early life and education ===
Born in 1903 in Plédran (Brittany, France), Jean de Largentaye came from a monarchist background. His parents were landowners in Brittany. After an education with the Jesuits exiled in Jersey Channel Island was admitted to Polytechnique in 1921 at the age of 17.

=== Professional background ===
Upon graduating from Polytechnique, he was recruited as an engineer by the company L'Air Liquide and appointed to a plant located in Asturias in northern Spain. He was dismissed after a few years, following the 1929 depression.

He then prepared for the competitive examination of the Inspection des Finances and was admitted to this corps in 1931. Chargé de mission in the cabinet of Finance Minister Marcel Régnier in 1935, he was assigned to the Mouvement Général des Fonds in 1936 and worked there under the direction of Jacques Rueff until his mobilization in September 1939. It was under the Popular Front government led by Léon Blum that Jean de Largentaye discovered Keynes's General Theory. This reading, which "enlightened him", in his own words, prompted him to offer himself as a translator to Keynes, who accepted his services. The translation ultimately includes a "lexicon" of Keynesian terminology, some fifty technical terms translated and defined in French, which results from an abundant correspondence with Keynes, who was anxious to find the right word in French. According to French historian and sociologist Pierre Rosanvallon, Jean de Largentaye along with Georges Boris, was one of the main propagators of the Keynesian vision, particularly among the civil servants who were preparing Léon Blum's recovery plan of April 1938.

As part of his mobilization at the Ministry of Armaments, Jean de Largentaye left for the France embassy in Madrid at the beginning of 1940, when Philippe Pétain was ambassador there, and then was appointed financial attaché in Spain and Portugal under the authority of François Piétri, Ambassador. He left his post on 2 May 1943, to join the French Committee for National Liberation (CFLN) in Algiers where he worked for Pierre Mendès France. In July 1944, Mendès France led the French delegation to the Bretton Woods Conference, of which Largentaye was a member.

Between 1946 and 1964, he was a French Executive Director at the IMF. This long mandate was marked by strong tensions between France and the international institution, notably over the issue of the Mayer devaluation (January 1948), on American capital exports to France and on the alleged insufficiency of international liquidity at the time of the first general borrowing agreements in 1962. He distinguished himself by his marked opposition to American hegemony, as André de Lattre, his deputy in 1954–1955, pointed out in his memoirs. Returning to France in 1964, he was a member of the Economic and Social Council. He took part in the debate on the international monetary system organized by this assembly in 1966 and opposed the return to the gold standard defended by Jacques Rueff as well as to a fiduciary currency (special drawing rights) advocated by Robert Triffin and taken up by Albin Chalandon.

In 1969, he finished the complete revision of his translation of Keynes's General Theory and added a "translator's note", his "economic testament".

He died in 1970 in Paris at the age of 66.

== Economic thought ==
Trained in the classical school, the doxa taught at the École libre des sciences politiques, at Polytechnique and at the Faculty of Law, he was nevertheless convinced from the beginning of the 1930s of the danger of deflationary policies carried out by politicians in office (Laval in France in 1935, Brüning in Germany in 1932, Mellon and Hoover in the United States in 1929–1933). Reading Keynes provided him with a theoretical framework that supported this intuition and made him criticize both saving which led to unemployment and the whole Bretton Woods monetary system, which subordinated the objective of full employment to the respect of international constraints.

However, at the end of his life, Jean de Largentaye gradually distanced himself from John Maynard Keynes. His professional reflections led him to the conclusion that the General Theory was certainly valid for economies governed by fiat currencies, but that policies inspired by it were incapable of ensuring both full employment and price stability.

He also explains, in the article "The issuance of fiat money", that private banks have appropriated the sovereign privilege of issuing money. But he believes that money issuing must be backed by real assets if money is to recover both its neutrality and its countercyclical function.

In addition to his functions at the IMF (1946-1964) and then openly at the Economic and Social Council (1964-1969), he led a fight until the end of his life for a radical monetary reform aimed at replacing fiduciary currencies by commodity currencies. In this struggle, he took up the ideas defended by Benjamin Graham at both national and international levels and by Piero Sraffa with regard to the theory of value.

His monetary reflections led to the publication in 1967 of an article in Economie appliquée in which he detailed his project. He proposed the introduction of a currency backed by a basket of goods, the precise composition of which would be determined by the parties involved. A monetary agency would store these goods, as well as buy and sell them in order to regulate their prices. The deposit of these goods by producers would result in the issuance of "commodity standard certificates", which would function like banknotes in the real economy exchanges. These certificates would be convertible into goods at any time at the monetary agency. By a mechanism of connecting vessels between the sector producing goods included in the standard and the sectors producing other goods, this monetary system would automatically ensure both price stability and full employment, according to Jean de Largentaye.

At the international level, such a system would allow the different countries of the world to escape the "exorbitant privilege" of the United States, producers of the reference currency - the American dollar - a fiduciary currency issued by the American banking system. This system would be beneficial in particular for developing countries, the main producers of the raw materials included in the standard, as Pierre Mendès France defended in several issues of the Courrier de la République.

== Publications ==
In 2023, Classiques Garnier editions published a collection of works by Largentaye. The book includes a comprehensive biography of Largentaye in addition to the selected works.

- « L'écueil de l'économie monétaire », Revue d'Alger, No. 1, 1944, p. 50-59.
- The danger of monetary economy, The International Journal of Political Economy, Vol. 42, no.1 Spring 2013.
- « L'émission de la monnaie fiduciaire », Revue d'Alger, No. 5, 1944, p. 1-17.
- « L'accord de Bretton Woods et l'organisation financière internationale », Paris, Collection Droit Social XXXIII, Librairie sociale et économique, 1948.
- "La liquidité internationale", Tiers-Monde, April 1966, pp. 463–480.
- "Un faux problème : le manque de liquidité internationale", Le Monde, 5 and 6 June 1966.
- "L'étalon-marchandises", Economie Appliquée, Septembre 1967, pp. 265–318 « The commodities standard » https://mpra.ub.uni-muenchen.de/91750/
- Jean de Largentaye, Alban Chalandon and Jacques Rueff, La réforme du système monétaire international, Paris, Editions France-Empire, 1967, 119-143 et 165–175.
- J.M. Keynes (ed.) and Jean de Largentaye, Deuxième note du traducteur, Payot, 1969 (réimpr. 2017), « La Théorie générale », p. 19-27.
- "A note on the General Theory of Employment, Interest and Money", Journal of Post Keynesian Economics, Vol. 1, Spring 1979
