= MXV =

MXV may refer to:

- Mexican unidad de inversión, a currency unit used in Mexico intended to compensate for the effects of inflation
- MxV Rail, a railroad research, training, and testing facility in Pueblo, Colorado, United States
- Mörön Airport, the IATA code MXV
