= WCU =

WCU may stand for:

- West Chester University, in West Chester, Pennsylvania, USA
- West China University, in Chengdu, Sichuan, China
- West Coast University, in Irvine, California, USA
- Western Carolina University, in Cullowhee, North Carolina, USA
- Western Colorado University, in Gunnison, Colorado, USA
- Working Class Union, associated with the Green Corn Rebellion
- World currency unit
