= Indexed unit of account =

Payment pegged to inflation

A daily indexed unit of account or daily Consumer Price Index (CPI) can be used in contracts or in the Capital Maintenance in Units of Constant Purchasing Power accounting model, to ensure that deferred payments and constant real value non-monetary items are indexed to the general price level in terms of a Daily Index. This is done so that the real value of these items is not affected by changes in the inflation rate (in the case of monetary items) or by the stable measuring unit assumption (in the case of constant real value non-monetary items). Non-indexed units, such as contracts written in nominal currency units and nominal monetary items, incur inflation or deflation risk in the case of monetary items. During all periods of inflation, the debtor pays less in real terms than what both the debtor and creditor agreed at the original time of the contract or sale. On the other hand, in periods of deflation, the debtor pays more in real terms than the original agreed value. The opposite is true for creditors. Contracts and constant real value non-monetary items accounted in daily indexed units of account, Daily CPI or monetized daily indexed units of account incur no inflation or deflation risk, as the real value of payments and outstanding capital amounts remain constant over time while the nominal values are inflation- or deflation-indexed daily.

Indexation is typically achieved by adjusting payments and outstanding capital as well as interest values using a Daily consumer price index or a monetized daily indexed unit of account. A monetized daily indexed unit of account, called the Unidad de Fomento was introduced in Chile in 1967, but it was only in the early 1980s that it was widely adopted by both the Chilean people and the Chilean government. Its original base value has never been changed. By 1983, over 60 percent of total bank loans in Chile were written in the UF. which eliminated the effect of inflation during inflation. The value of the UF in pesos is published daily in all major Chilean newspapers and on government websites. Initial doubts about the Chilean governments ability to adopt inflation targeting under such an indexed financial system proved unfounded as the Central Bank of Chile has successfully maintained low inflation rates since 1998.

In 1848, John Stuart Mill discussed the inflation risk of non-indexed units of accounts. He stated that "All variations in the value of the circulating medium are mischievous: they disturb existing contracts and expectations, and the liability to such changes renders every pecuniary engagement of long date entirely precarious." In 1887 William Stanley Jevons referred to previous authors and discussed an indexed unit of account which he calls a "tabular standard of value". In 1887 Alfred Marshall, also referring to previous authors, discussed a similar proposal. In 1998 and onwards, Robert Shiller similarly argued for the introduction of an indexed unit of account into the United States economy as a means of eliminating inflation risk.

== See also ==
- Constant Item Purchasing Power Accounting
- WCU – World Currency Unit
- Mexican Unidad de Inversion
- Unidad de Fomento
- Unidad de Valor Constante
- Unidade Real de Valor
