= Sterling crisis =

Sterling crisis may refer to:

- 1931 sterling crisis, emergency measures during the Great Depression
- 1949 sterling crisis, devaluation
- 1967 sterling crisis, devaluation
- 1976 sterling crisis, IMF loan
- 1992 sterling crisis ("Black Wednesday"), depreciation

== See also ==
- Currency crisis
