= Unidad de Fomento =

Unit of account used in Chile

ISO 4217
- Code: CLF (numeric: 990)
- Subunit: 0.0001

Unit
- Plural: Unidades de Fomento
- Symbol: UF

Demographics
- User(s): Chile

Issuance
- Central bank: Banco Central de Chile

Valuation
- Inflation: Inflation adjusted

The Unidades de Fomento (UF, lit. 'Units of Account') is a unit of account and a non-circulating currency used in Chile. The exchange rate between the UF and the Chilean peso, the country's legal tender, is constantly adjusted for inflation so that UF's purchasing power remains almost constant on a daily basis during low inflation.

It was created on 20 January 1967, for the use in determining the principal and interest in international secured loans for development, subject to revaluation according to inflation. Afterwards it was extended to all types of bank loans, private or special financing, purchases and investments on installments, contracts, and some special situations. It is also used in legal standards such as the par value of stock and capitalization of companies, and fines.

It has become the preferred and predominant measure to determine the cost of real estate, values of housing and any secured loan, either private or of the Chilean government. Individual payments are made in Chilean pesos, according to the daily value of the UF. A similar currency unit for use generally in payment of taxes, fines, or customs duty is the Unidad Tributaria Mensual (UTM) (lit. 'Monthly tax unit').

== Calculation over time ==
From its creation in 1967, each calendar quarter, the UF value of 100 Chilean escudos would be quoted based on the Consumer Price Index (CPI) of the past three months, which would be the official rate for the following quarter. In October 1975 with the currency changeover to pesos, the value of 1 UF was quoted in pesos and readjusted monthly. In July 1977 it was calculated daily by interpolation between the 10th of each month and the 9th of the following month, according to the monthly variation of the CPI. Since 1990 the Central Bank of Chile has determined its value. The values of the CPI are officially kept by the National Statistics Institute. Historical values of the UF as of 31 December each year (unlike below, in Chile numbers are written with a decimal comma and a dot to separate thousands):

Year	Value Pesos ($) or escudos (Eº)
1967	Eº 115.38
1968	Eº 148.17
1969	Eº 194.40
1970	Eº 256.67
1971	Eº 301.24
1972	Eº 533.92
1973	Eº 2,155.11
1974	Eº 15,887.00
1975	$94.70 (Eº 94,700)
1976	$275.78
1977	$462.58
1978	$613.37
1979	$842.14
1980	$1,103.61
1981	$1,232.25
1982	$1,464.67
1983	$1,824.03
1984	$2,230.05
1985	$2,818.39
1986	$3,298.77
1987	$4,044.03
1988	$4,484.39
1989	$5,432.32
1990	$7,043.38
1991	$8,286.27
1992	$9,423.57
1993	$10,623.13
1994	$11,533.17
1995	$12,482.81
1996	$13,280.48
1997	$14,096.93
1998	$14,685.39
1999	$15,066.96
2000	$15,769.92
2001	$16,262.66
2002	$16,744.12
2003	$16,920.00
2004	$17,317.05
2005	$17,974.81
2006	$18,336.38
2007	$19,622.66
2008	$21,452.57
2009	$20,942.88
2010	$21,455.55
2011	$22,294.03
2012	$22,840.75
2013	$23,309.56
2014	$24,627.10
2015	$25,629.09
2016	$26,347.98
2017	$26,798.14
2018	$27,565.79
2019	$28,309.94
2020	$29,070.33
2021	$30,991.74
2022	$35,110.98
2023	$36,789.36
2023	$38,416.69
Source: SII

== See also ==
- Constant Item Purchasing Power Accounting
- Unidade Real de Valor, used in Brazil in the early 1990s.
- Indexed unit of account
- Unidad de Fomento de Vivienda, a similar instrument used in Bolivia.
