= 1967 sterling devaluation =

1967 sterling crisis

On 18 November 1967, the British government devalued sterling from US$2.80 to $2.40 per pound (correspondingly changing its gold parity for £1 from 2.48828 g to 2.13281 g). It ended a long sterling crisis that had started in 1964 with the election of Labour in the 1964 general election, but originated in the balance of payments crises of the preceding Conservative government.

== Historical background ==
As soon as Harold Wilson's newly elected Labour government took power after winning the 1964 general election, vowing to end the Conservatives' "stop-go" economic policies, sterling came under pressure because the market feared that Labour would devalue the currency so as to be able to implement a looser monetary policy, favouring growth. Upon coming to power, the government was informed that they had inherited an exceptionally large deficit of £800 million (Note: about £16 billion at 2024 prices, using GDP deflator) on Britain's external balance of trade, partly caused by the preceding (Conservative) government's expansive fiscal policy in the run-up to the 1964 election. Wilson wrote in his autobiography that the life of his government was "dominated by an inherited balance of payments problem which was nearing a crisis at the moment we took office". Immediately on announcing the trade figures, the pound came under increased pressure. Many economists advocated devaluation of the pound in response, but Wilson resisted, reportedly in part out of concern that Labour, which had previously devalued sterling in 1949, would become tagged as "the party of devaluation". Wilson also believed that a devaluation would disproportionately harm low-income Britons with savings and poorer Commonwealth of Nations countries in the sterling area. The government instead opted to deal with the problem by imposing a temporary surcharge on imports, and a series of deflationary measures designed to reduce demand and therefore the inflow of imports. In the latter half of 1967, an attempt was made to prevent the recession in activity from going too far, in the form of a stimulus to consumer durable spending through an easing of credit, which in turn prevented a rise in unemployment.

International aid is mostly what had helped maintain the $2.80 value of sterling between 1964 and 1967, thanks to "lines of credit from central banks and the IMF and [...] a swap network with the Federal Reserve Bank of New York". These enabled the Bank of England to intervene on the foreign exchange market. Nevertheless, in the absence of improvements to the fundamental economic situation of the United Kingdom, delaying the devaluation only served to reduce the Bank of England's dollar reserves.

== Consequences ==
According to Catherine Schenk, the 1967 devaluation became "emblematic of the inability of the Labour Party to cope effectively with the reduction of sterling's international role". After the devaluation, the IMF sent a mission to London and on 29 November 1967 offered a £1.4 billion loan to the UK. (Note: about £29 billion at 2024 prices, using GDP deflator)

While the 1949 devaluation helped the British economy, the 1967 version did not improve the United Kingdom's economic position. The devaluation also failed to improve the Bank of England's reserve position. To appear stronger than it was towards the markets after the devaluation, the Bank of England started manipulating or "window dressing" its reserve figures.

== See also ==
- Sterling crisis (disambiguation) – list of sterling crises
