= Synthetic currency pair =

In foreign exchange market, synthetic currency pair or synthetic cross currency pair is an artificial currency pair which generally is not available in market but one needs to trade across those pairs. One highly traded currency, usually United States dollar, which trades with the target currencies, is taken as intermediary currency and offsetting positions are taken on target currencies. The use of synthetic cross currency pairs has become less common with wide availability of most common currency pairs in the market.

== Overview ==
There are many official currencies worldwide but not all currencies are traded actively in the forex market. Currencies backed by economically and politically stable nations or unions such as USD and EUR are traded actively. Also, the more liquid the currency, the more demand there is for that currency. For example, United States dollar is world's most actively traded currency due to the size and strength of the United States economy and global acceptance of USD.

The eight most traded currencies (in no specific order) are: the U.S. dollar (USD), the Canadian dollar (CAD), the euro (EUR), the British pound (GBP), the Swiss franc (CHF), the New Zealand dollar (NZD), the Australian dollar (AUD) and the Japanese yen (JPY).

Currencies are traded in pairs. The above-mentioned eight currencies can generate 28 different currency pairs that can be traded. However, not all of them are quoted by forex market makers. Depending on the liquidity of currencies, there are 18 currency pairs which are quoted by forex market makers. These pairs are:

USD/CAD	EUR/JPY
EUR/USD	EUR/CHF
USD/CHF	EUR/GBP
GBP/USD	AUD/CAD
NZD/USD	GBP/CHF
AUD/USD	GBP/JPY
USD/JPY	CHF/JPY
EUR/CAD	AUD/JPY
EUR/AUD	AUD/NZD

As soon as trading has to take place for a non trading(non quoted) currency pairs or for pairs which do not have enough liquidity, an alternate route is taken to create the currency pair. The pair thus created is known as synthetic pair. A synthetic currency pair is created by trading two separate currency pairs in such a way as to effectively trade a third currency pair. Usually, USD is taken as intermediary currency to create any desirable synthetic cross currency pair.

For example, the AUD/CAD pair can be traded by creating a synthetic currency pair from two separate currencies. In this scenario, USD can be taken as intermediary currency. To trade AUD/CAD pair, the trader would simultaneously buy the AUD/USD(buying AUD and selling USD) pair and buy the USD/CAD(buying USD and selling CAD) pair.

== Advantages ==
- A synthetic currency pair allows one to reduce the spread costs of trading.
- Crosses create more opportunities for traders by giving them more currencies to trade.
- Typically, trends and ranges are cleaner on currency crosses than they are on the major currency pairs.
- Trading crosses allows you to take advantage of differences in interest rates.

== Overheads ==
Trading a synthetic pair requires opening two separate positions. This increases the cost of the trade and the exposure to the account. Any interest rate differentials between the three countries involved could also have a negative impact on the profitability of the trade if it is carried overnight.

Synthetic pairs are generally used by financial institutions that wish to put on large positions, but there is not enough liquidity in the market in order to do so. It is generally not a practical solution in the retail forex market.

One of the problems with creating synthetic currency pairs is that they tie up double the amount of margin as would be required if the exact pair was offered through the broker. This also means that the trader must pay the spread on both of the pairs used to create the synthetic pair. But this may not be of much relevance because if the pair was offered directly through the broker interface, it would most likely have a similar spread cost.

== See also ==
- Foreign exchange market
- World currency
- International finance
