= Unidad de Fomento de Vivienda =

Inflation-adjusted unit of account used in Bolivia

Unit
- Plural: Unidades de Fomento de Vivienda
- Symbol: UFV

Demographics
- User(s): Bolivia

Issuance
- Central bank: Central Bank of Bolivia
- Website: www.bcb.gob.bo

Valuation
- Inflation: Inflation adjusted

The Unidad de Fomento de Vivienda (UFV) is an inflation-adjusted unit of account used in Bolivia. The UFV is used as a non-circulating currency, and the exchange rate between the UVF and the Bolivian boliviano is set by the Central Bank of Bolivia, calculated on the basis of the Consumer Price Index published by the National Institute of Statistics of Bolivia (INE).

== History ==
The UFV was created by the Supreme Decree 26390 of November 8, 2001 and became effective on December 7 of the same year with an initial value of one boliviano. It was introduced as a measure to promote housing finance and to stabilize the financial system in the context of high inflation and currency devaluation.

== Uses ==
The UFV is used as a unit of account for various financial transactions and contracts, such as:

- Loans and deposits in the banking system
- Mortgages and leases
- Public debt instruments
- Taxes and fees
- Salaries and pensions

The use of the UFV as a unit of account aims to protect the purchasing power of money and to facilitate long-term financing. The UFV is not a legal tender and cannot be used as a means of payment. All transactions denominated in UFV must be settled in bolivianos at the exchange rate of the day.

== See also ==
- Unidad de Fomento, a similar unit of account used in Chile
