= Robert Triffin =

Belgian-American economist (1911–1993)

Baron Robert Triffin
- Born: 5 October 1911; Flobecq, Belgium
- Died: 23 February 1993 (aged 81); Ostend, Belgium

Academic background
- Education: Harvard University; Catholic University of Leuven
- Doctoral advisor: Edward Chamberlin; Wassily Leontief
- Other advisors: John D. Black; Léon H. Dupriez; Edwin F. Gay; Frank Knight; Henry Schultz; Joseph Schumpeter; Paul van Zeeland

Academic work
- Institutions: Yale University
- Doctoral students: Béla Balassa
- Notable ideas: Triffin's dilemma

Robert, Baron Triffin (5 October 1911 – 23 February 1993) was a Belgian-American economist best known for his critique (referred to as Triffin's dilemma) of the Bretton Woods system of fixed exchange rates.

== Life ==
Triffin was born in 1911 in Flobecq. In 1929, he enrolled at the Faculty of Law of the Catholic University of Leuven, to study law and philosophy; in 1934, he also began studying economics, and graduated in 1935. As a student, he was active in progressive Catholic circles, and developed pacifist convictions. In 1935, Triffin received a scholarship from the Belgian American Educational Foundation, and moved to the United States, where he studied at Harvard University and received a doctoral degree in economics in 1938.

He taught at Harvard till 1942, and became a naturalised citizen of the United States that year. He held positions in the US Federal Reserve System (1942–1946), the International Monetary Fund (1946–1948), and the Organisation for European Economic Co-operation (1948–1951), and helped administer the Marshall Plan while serving in the Economic Cooperation Administration. In 1951, he became a professor of economics at Yale University, where he also served as Master of Berkeley College from 1969 until 1977.

In 1977, Triffin returned to reside in Europe, where he was a staunch supporter of European integration and helped to develop the European Monetary System. He also supported the development of the European Central Bank. In 1989, he was made a baron by King Baudouin.

== Bretton Woods critique ==
In 1959, Triffin testified before the United States Congress and warned of serious flaws in the Bretton Woods system. His theory was based on observing the dollar glut, or the accumulation of the United States dollar outside the US. Under the Bretton Woods system, the US had pledged to convert dollars into gold, but by the early 1960s, the glut had caused more dollars to be available outside the US than gold was in its Treasury.

In the post-war era, the US had to run deficits on the current account of the balance of payments to supply the world with dollar reserves that kept liquidity for their increased wealth.

However, running continuing deficits on the current account of the balance of payments resulted in an ever-increasing stock of overseas-held dollars, eroding confidence in the belief that the dollar would remain convertible into gold at the Bretton Woods parity rate of $35 per ounce.

Triffin predicted that the system would not be able to maintain both liquidity and confidence, a theory later to be known as the Triffin dilemma. His idea was largely ignored until 1971, when his hypothesis became reality, forcing US President Richard Nixon to halt convertibility of the United States dollar into gold, an initiative known colloquially as the Nixon Shock, which effectively ended the Bretton Woods System.

A fundamental reform of the international monetary system has long been overdue. Its necessity and urgency are further highlighted today by the imminent threat to the once mighty U.S. dollar.

— Robert Triffin

== Bibliography ==
- Monopolistic Competition and General Equilibrium Theory, 1940.
- "National central banking and the international economy", 1947, Board of Governors, Federal Reserve System.
- Europe and the Money Muddle, 1957.
- Gold and the Dollar Crisis: The future of convertibility, 1960.
- Statistics of Sources and Uses of Finance, 1948–1958, with Stuvel et al., 1960.
- "Intégration économique européenne et politique monetaire", 1960, Revue Econ Politique
- The Evolution of the International Monetary System: historical appraisal and future perspectives, 1964.
- The World Money Maze: National currencies in international payments, 1966.
- Our International Monetary System: Yesterday, today and tomorrow, 1968.
- "The Thrust of History in International Monetary Reform", 1969, Foreign Affairs
- "The Use of SDR Finance for Collectively Agreed Purposes", BNLQR
- "The international role and fate of the dollar", 1978, Foreign Affairs
- "The European Monetary System: Tombstone or cornerstone?", in: The international monetary system: forty years after Bretton Woods. Proceedings of a conference held at Bretton Woods, N.H., May 1984, 1984
- "The future of the European Monetary System and the ECU", 1984, CEPS Papers
- " The international accounts of the United States and their impact upon the rest of the world", 1985, BNLQR
- "Une Banque Monétaire Européenne avec des fonctions de banque centrale", 1986, Répères, Bulletin Économique et Financier
- "L'avenir du système monétaire et financier international : gestion de crises chroniques ou réformes fondamentales?", 1986, Répères, Bulletin Économique et Financier
- "The IMS (International Monetary System ... or Scandal?) and the EMS (European Monetary System)", 1987, BNLQR
- "The European Monetary System in the World Economy", 1989, Rivista di politica economica
- "L'interdépendance du politique et de l'économique dans le scandale monétaire mondial : diagnostic et prescription", 1989, Répères, Bulletin Économique et Financier
- "The International Monetary System : 1949–1989", 1990, ECU Newsletter Torino.

== Honors ==
- Honorary degree, University of Pavia, 1991.

== See also ==
- Jacques van Ypersele de Strihou
- Money doctor
