= Dollar gap =

Economic Term

Dollar gap is an economic term denoting a situation where the stock of US dollars is insufficient to satisfy the demand of foreign customers. The usage of the word "gap" specifically refers to the positive difference between exports and imports, i.e. US active trade balance of the U.S. after World War II, which led to the difference between the need for dollars and their limited supply.

== History ==
The lack of dollars suffered mainly by European states after World War II, specifically from 1944-1960. The result was the risk of a slowdown in foreign trade, which depended on the convertibility of European currencies into US dollars. The Bretton Woods monetary system was a key dollar service used in international transactions.

Between 1946 and 1951, the United States accumulated trade surpluses. This created a shortage of dollars, as Europe needed to finance its imports from the United States without being able to balance its balance with its exports. This shortcoming was addressed by creating dollars and paying them to other states, which was also one of the goals of the Marshall Plan. Furthermore, clearinghouses (European Payments Union) were created to smooth payment processing.

In the long run, the dollar gap was solved by US balance of payments deficits, a period of so-called dollar glut.
