= Jamaica Accords =

1976 international agreements; ended Bretton Woods system

The Jamaica Accords were a set of international agreements that ratified the end of the Bretton Woods monetary system. They took the form of recommendations to change the "articles of agreement" that the International Monetary Fund (IMF) was founded upon. The agreement was concluded after meetings by a committee of the board of governors of the IMF, held on 7–8 January 1976 at Kingston, Jamaica.

The accords allowed the price of gold to float with respect to the U.S. dollar and other currencies, albeit within a set of agreed constraints. In practice the dollar had been floating in this way, in contravention of the articles of an agreement of the IMF, after the Nixon shock in 1971. The accords also made provisions for financial assistance to developing countries representing the Group of 77 member countries to compensate for lost earnings from the export of primary commodities. An amendment was made in 1978 to allow for the creation of Special Drawing Rights, described as a low-cost line of credit for developing countries.
