= Dollar glut =

The dollar glut is a term for the accumulation of American dollars outside of the United States as a reserve currency, contrasted with the dollar gap, which led to the creation of the Marshall Plan following World War II. The eventual shift to a dollar glut forced the end of the gold standard in the United States and led to the collapse of the Bretton Woods system.

The stability of the Bretton Woods system came to depend upon the ability of the US government to exchange dollars for gold at $35 an ounce. The American ability to fulfill this commitment began to diminish as the postwar dollar shortage was transformed into an overabundance of dollars, also known as the dollar glut.

== See also ==
- Dollar gap
