= Leads and lags =

Time adjustment of foreign exchange payments

In international finance, leads and lags refer to the expediting or delaying, respectively, of settlement of payments or receipts in a foreign exchange transaction because of an expected change in exchange rates. A change in exchange rates can be a cause of loss (or gain) in international trade, thus the settlement of debts is expedited or delayed in an attempt to minimize the loss or to maximize the gain. In the leads and lags, the premature payment for goods purchased is called a "lead," while the delayed payment is called a "lag."

== Description ==
A change in exchange rates can be a cause of loss (or gain) in international trade. For example, now, we suppose that the euro to U.S. dollar exchange rate is 1.00 (€1.00 buys one dollar). In addition, we suppose that an importer of U.S. buys goods for €1000 from a European exporter and the U.S. importer will pay the money 1 month later. If the euro to U.S. dollar exchange rate is 2.00 one month later, the U.S. importer must prepare €1000 with $2000 in the foreign exchange market for the payment. On the other hand, If the euro to U.S. dollar exchange rate is 0.50 one month later, the U.S. importer is able to prepare €1000 with $500 for the payment.

Thus, if a rise in the exchange rates is expected in the future, the buyer may delay the payment of goods because such a delay can make purchasing the goods less costly. Conversely, if a decline in the exchange rates is expected in the future, the buyer may pay ahead of time to minimize the loss.
