= 1949 sterling devaluation =

Currency crisis

The devaluation of sterling in 1949 (or 1949 sterling crisis) was a major currency crisis in the United Kingdom that led to a 30.5% devaluation of sterling from $4.03 per pound to $2.80 on 18 September 1949. Although the devaluation was made in the United Kingdom, more than 19 countries had currencies pegged to sterling and also devalued.

== Historical context ==
The devaluation, unlike the competitive 1931 sterling devaluation, was done in cooperation between all European nations. There was a general understanding among European nations that the sterling was overvalued and would need to be devalued. The IMF was in favour of a devaluation and wanted it to happen to allow other European currencies to also devalue. The timing of the devaluation remained unsure, in part because Chancellor of the Exchequer Stafford Cripps opposed devaluation. This led to progressive pressure on the currency, up to a breaking point forcing the British government to devalue.

The fundamental cause of the devaluation was a structural trade deficit of the United Kingdom with the United States. But in the short run, speculation also played a role. As there were capital controls in place, speculation could not take place through regular currency markets as speculative purchases of currency were forbidden by the controls. Instead, speculative pressure mounted through leads and lags.

== Decision ==
The decision to devalue the pound was made in Cripps’ absence (he departed for a sanatorium in Switzerland in July 1949). The decision was taken by Minister of Fuel and Power Hugh Gaitskell, Economic Secretary to the Treasury Douglas Jay, and then-President of the Board of Trade (and future Prime Minister) Harold Wilson; the three moved for devaluation within days of Cripps’ departure, and he only heard of the decision through a letter from Clement Attlee in August.

== Consequences ==
The immediate consequences of the devaluation were that other countries, many in the sterling area, followed suit. Australia, Burma, Ceylon, Denmark, Egypt, Finland, Greece, India, Iraq, Ireland, Israel, Netherlands, New Zealand, South Africa and Sweden all also devalued their currencies by 30.5%. France, Portugal, Belgium and Canada devalued their currencies slightly less than the UK did.

According to Larry Elliott (economics editor of The Guardian), the devaluation "highlighted Britain's diminished world status".

The devaluation was an important consideration during considerations within the United States government over whether to announce the detection, earlier that month, of the Soviet Union’s successful test of their first nuclear weapon. US President Harry S. Truman was aware of the test as early as 9 September, but elected to delay the announcement until after 18 September, in part to avoid the panic that was expected to ensue if announcement of the test preceded the devaluation.

The devaluation also laid the ground for negotiations that would lead to the European Payments Union (EPU).

== See also ==
- Sterling crisis (disambiguation) – list of sterling crisis articles
