= Mexican unidad de inversión =

Mexican currency funds unit

Unidad de inversión
ISO 4217
- Code: MXV (numeric: 979)
- Subunit: 0.01

Unit
- Plural: unidades de inversión UDIs

The unidad de inversión (UDI, literally "investment unit", ISO 4217 code MXV) is an index unit of funds used in Mexico. It can be traded in many currency markets because its value changes with respect to currencies. The value of the UDI was first set at one Mexican peso on April 4, 1995, after the Mexican peso crisis. Unlike currencies, it is designed to maintain a constant purchasing power with respect to the general consumer price index and not be subject to inflation. The Mexican credit system (especially mortgages) uses the UDI rather than the peso because of its stability.

The plural form "UDIs" is often used, even in official government documents, but is regarded as grammatically incorrect.

The following is a table of the value of the unidad de inversión on selected dates:

Historical values
Date	Value in Mexican pesos	Change from last year
April 4, 1995	1.000000	
January 10, 1996	1.351027	+35.1%
January 10, 1997	1.735446	+28.5%
January 10, 1998	2.009727	+15.8%
January 10, 1999	2.382641	+18.6%
January 10, 2000	2.679749	+12.5%
January 10, 2001	2.922224	+9.0%
January 10, 2002	3.058233	+4.7%
January 10, 2003	3.230335	+5.6%
January 10, 2004	3.356677	+3.9%
January 10, 2005	3.538055	+5.4%
January 10, 2006	3.646963	+3.1%
January 10, 2007	3.798090	+4.0%
January 10, 2008	3.937814	+3.7%
January 10, 2009	4.196185	+6.6%
January 10, 2010	4.347060	+3.6%
January 10, 2011	4.531767	+4.2%
January 10, 2012	4.706135	+3.8%
January 10, 2013	4.882970	+3.8%
January 10, 2014	5.071467	+3.9%
January 10, 2015	5.284015	+4.2%
January 10, 2016	5.389834	+2.0%
January 10, 2017	5.577329	+3.5%
January 10, 2018	5.950678	+6.7%
January 10, 2019	6.248483	+5.0%
January 10, 2020	6.413049	+2.6%
January 10, 2021	6.619514	+3.2%
January 10, 2022	7.112667	+7.4%
January 10, 2023	7.665425	+7.8%
January 10, 2024	8.007473	+4.5%
January 10, 2025	8.362982	+4.4%
January 10, 2026	8.674409	+3.7%
