= World currency unit =

Two proposals for an international unit of account

There are two different types of world currency unit in use today that have different origins and usages.

== History ==
The WCU was proposed by Lok Sang Ho of Lingnan University, Hong Kong. The WCU was first intended to be the basis for denominating global bonds, a debt instrument that is issued globally and is subscribable by people and institutions around the world. Simply put, it is a GDP-weighted basket of key currencies each of which is indexed against inflation for the relevant countries. The WCU is defined with respect to a base year, so that each unit represents the same global purchasing power as at that base year, when it is equal to US$1. If there is inflation, the WCU will be worth more than $1 after the base year, but will represent the same purchasing power. The unindexed basket, called the benchmark basket of key currencies, is the basis for the derivation of effective exchange rate indices that has been demonstrated to be both easy to compile and superior to most official effective exchange rate indices.

Rhett Morson has advocated the Standard Earth Monetary Unit (SEMU) since 1998 and continues to argue in support for it. However, it is not practicable to introduce it in one step for political reasons and so the preferred method of introduction is for countries to gradually move their currencies closer or in some cases to adopt another country's currency as a series of steps inching closer to the SEMU. Examples could include countries that have already adopted the US dollar as their currency or Australia and New Zealand joining forces or Pacific Islands adopting a larger country's currency. Ideally, the SEMU would coincide with trade barriers being removed and international laws moving into alignment.

== How it works ==
Today, there are two distinct products which have adopted the name "world currency unit".

=== WOCU ===
The WOCU (contraction of "world currency unit") is a standardized basket of currencies — the national currencies of the 20 largest national economies measured by GDP, established in 2008. The basket is reweighed semi-annually according to the relative growth of the economies, whereby constituent currencies are replaced by other currencies should the size of the GDP be overtaken by that of another national economy. Conceived as an apolitical and global alternative to the ECU, it is used as a reference currency for global investors and companies seeking to mitigate bilateral exchange rate volatility.

The WOCU offers a transparent, relatively stable currency quotation as a hub currency reference for cross border trade to reduce volatility and risk. It reacts to the economic growth and decline of constituent country economies, adjusting the prominence of their respective currencies. The WOCU is outputted in up to real time, in sub second updates. Input FX data is sourced from global aggregated FX data providers.

Countries within the Eurozone (those that have replaced their national currencies with the Euro) are treated as individual countries in the WOCU weighting calculation. This means that some countries within the Eurozone are included, such as Germany, whilst others are excluded, such as Ireland, purely on the basis of that country's top 20 GDP qualification or disqualification. The GDP values of each country issued by the International Monetary Fund in its World Economic Outlook forecast are reviewed as these figures become available and a biannual re-weighting of the benchmark basket performed. This means that the member countries included in the basket, and therefore their currencies, may change up to twice a year either by the weighting for their currency being adjusted (up or down) or by their fiat currency being promoted into or demoted out of the basket. This generally results in the basket consisting of 15 separate currencies, the Euro currency being common to normally 6 nation states included in the WOCU basket.

Review and approval of weighting adjustments is subject to a confirmation process overseen by the WOCU Oversight Committee, a body consisting of a majority of independent persons qualified and authorized to approve or reject any change to the constitution of the WOCU. In the circumstance of a reweighting where a country changes its currency, the replacement country currency FX data will form exactly the same proportion of the WOCU and the former currency will be dropped (or reduced in the case of the Euro) in the same proportion at the same time that the relevant country officially introduces its new currency, which shall be assessed and approved by the WOCU Oversight Committee.

The WOCU is used to price commodities such as bunker fuel and as a reference currency for global investors and companies seeking to mitigate bilateral exchange rate volatility.

In early 2019, Unite Global AS, a Norway incorporated provider of a Correspondent banking hub platform for cross border banking payments and real-time settlement revealed it was in discussions for the issuance and distribution of WOCU currency.

=== WCU ===
The World Currency Unit (WCU) is an indexed unit of account that stands for a unit of real global purchasing power.

Since each unit by design represents a stable unit of purchasing power, the stipulated interest rate on WCU-denominated bonds represents a real interest rate. In principle, the common denomination of bonds by issuers from different parts of the world using the WCU, as well as the greater transparency of real interest rates, will produce more efficient capital markets, as savers and borrowers around the world converge in their understanding of what each basis point of interest means and are protected against two key sources of uncertainty, namely inflation and exchange loss risks.

Irving Fisher in his 1911 book The Purchasing Power of Money had advised that, to serve as a unit of account, a trusted medium of exchange, and a reliable store of value, the purchasing power of money should be stable. Unfortunately, substances that exist by the bounty of nature, such as gold or silver, cannot have such property since their values fluctuate with changing supply and demand. This is the main motivation behind indexed units of account, of which Robert Shiller of Yale University is a principal proponent. To be meaningful in terms of stable global purchasing power, a WCU will have to represent a basket of global output. By definition, according to the initial proposal by Ho, the WCU represents the sum of the gross domestic products of key market economies in the world, namely the US, the Eurozone and UK, Japan, Canada, and Australia. Addition of these GDPs, each in a separate currency, is done by converting all GDPs into US dollar values in the base year.

The sum of these GDPs are then scaled down to equal $100 in the base year. The scaling factor then becomes part of the definition of the WCU, as it defines the size of the GDP basket. It is envisaged that every 5 or 10 years, the WCU can be rebased, with the new series using a new base year spliced to the old series much like consumer price indices with different base years are spliced to form a continuous series.

The formula for the valuation of the World Currency Unit has been revised since 2008 so that the GDP weights are now revised every year. While still retaining the meaning of a unit of global real purchasing power, the WCU can now be interpreted as a GDP-weighted basket of currencies, each indexed against domestic inflation. The GDP-weighted basket of currencies has now formed the basis for a new formula for the effective exchange rate.

The nominal value of this unit would rise with inflation in each economy. Moreover, the nominal value of this unit would rise if other currencies represented in the basket appreciate against the US dollar. Savers purchasing such bonds would not only enjoy protection against inflation, but would benefit from the diversification of exchange risks.

The WCU could be used for the pricing of commodities such as oil, precious metals, and agricultural products, which are typically quoted in US dollars. Of course, historical prices of commodities quoted in US dollars could also be converted into prices in WCUs to provide indications on trends in the real prices of these commodities.

== See also ==
- International dollar
- Special drawing rights
- North American monetary union
- African monetary union
- Bancor
