= 2008–2009 Keynesian resurgence =

Great Recession-era revival of interest in aggregate demand-side economics

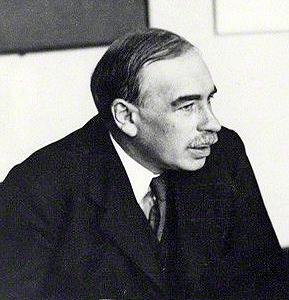
John Maynard Keynes

The 2008 financial crisis was followed by a global resurgence of interest in Keynesian economics among prominent economists and policy makers. This included discussions and implementation of economic policies in accordance with the recommendations made by John Maynard Keynes in response to the Great Depression of the 1930s, particularly fiscal stimulus and expansionary monetary policy.

From the end of the Great Depression until the early 1970s, Keynesian economics provided the main inspiration for economic policy makers in Western industrialized countries. The influence of Keynes's theories waned in the 1970s due to stagflation and critiques from Friedrich Hayek, Milton Friedman, Robert Lucas Jr., and other economists who had less faith in the ability of government intervention to regulate the economy, or were otherwise opposed to Keynesian policies. From the early 1980s to 2008, the consensus among economists was that fiscal stimulus would be ineffective even in a recession, and such policies were only occasionally employed by the governments of developed countries.

In 2008, prominent economic journalists and economists began arguing in favour of Keynesian stimulus. From October onward, policy makers began announcing major stimulus packages to prevent a global depression. By early 2009, there was widespread acceptance among the world's economic policy makers about the need for fiscal stimulus. Yet by late 2009, the consensus among economists began to break down. In 2010, with a depression averted but unemployment in many countries still high, policy makers generally decided against further fiscal stimulus, with several voicing concerns over public debt. Unconventional monetary policy continued to be used in attempts to increase economic activity. By 2016, increasing concerns had arisen that monetary policy was reaching the limit of its effectiveness, and several countries began to return to fiscal stimulus.

== Background ==
=== Competing views on macroeconomic policy ===
Macroeconomic policy focuses on high level government decisions which affect overall national economies rather than lower level decisions concerning markets for particular goods and services. Keynes was the first economist to popularize macroeconomics and also the notion that governments can and should intervene in the economy to alleviate the suffering caused by unemployment. Before the Keynesian Revolution that followed Keynes's 1936 publication of his General Theory, the prevailing orthodoxy was that the economy would naturally establish full employment. So successful was the revolution that the period spanning the aftermath of World War II to about 1973 has been referred to as the Age of Keynes. Stagnating economic performance in the early 1970s successfully shattered the previous consensus for Keynesian economics and provided support for a counter revolution. Milton Friedman's monetarism school was prominent in displacing Keynes' ideas both in academia and from the practical world of economic policy making. A key common feature of the anti-Keynesian schools of thought is that they argued for policy ineffectiveness or policy irrelevance. Although the theoretical justifications vary, the various schools all hold that government intervention will be much less effective than Keynes had believed, with some advocates even claiming that in the long run interventionist policy will always be counterproductive.

Keynesian economics followed on from the Keynesian Revolution. In contrast to the recent resurgence of Keynesian policy making, the revolution initially comprised a shift change in theory. There had been several experiments in policy making that can be seen as precursors for Keynes' ideas, notably President Franklin D. Roosevelt's famous New Deal. These experiments had been influenced more by morals, geopolitics and political ideology than by new developments in economics, even though Keynes had found some support in the United States for his ideas about counter-cyclical public works policy as early as 1931. According to Gordon Fletcher, Keynes' General Theory provided a conceptual justification for New Deal-type policies which was lacking in the established economics of the day. This was immensely significant, as in the absence of a proper theoretical underpinning there was a danger that ad hoc policies of moderate intervention would be overtaken by extremist solutions, as had already happened in much of Europe. However, Keynes did not agree with all aspects of the New Deal; he considered that the almost immediate revival of business activity after the program's launch could only be accounted for by dangerous-to-rely-on psychological factors, such as the boost to confidence effected by Roosevelt's inspiring oratory.

=== Keynesian ascendancy 1941–1979 ===
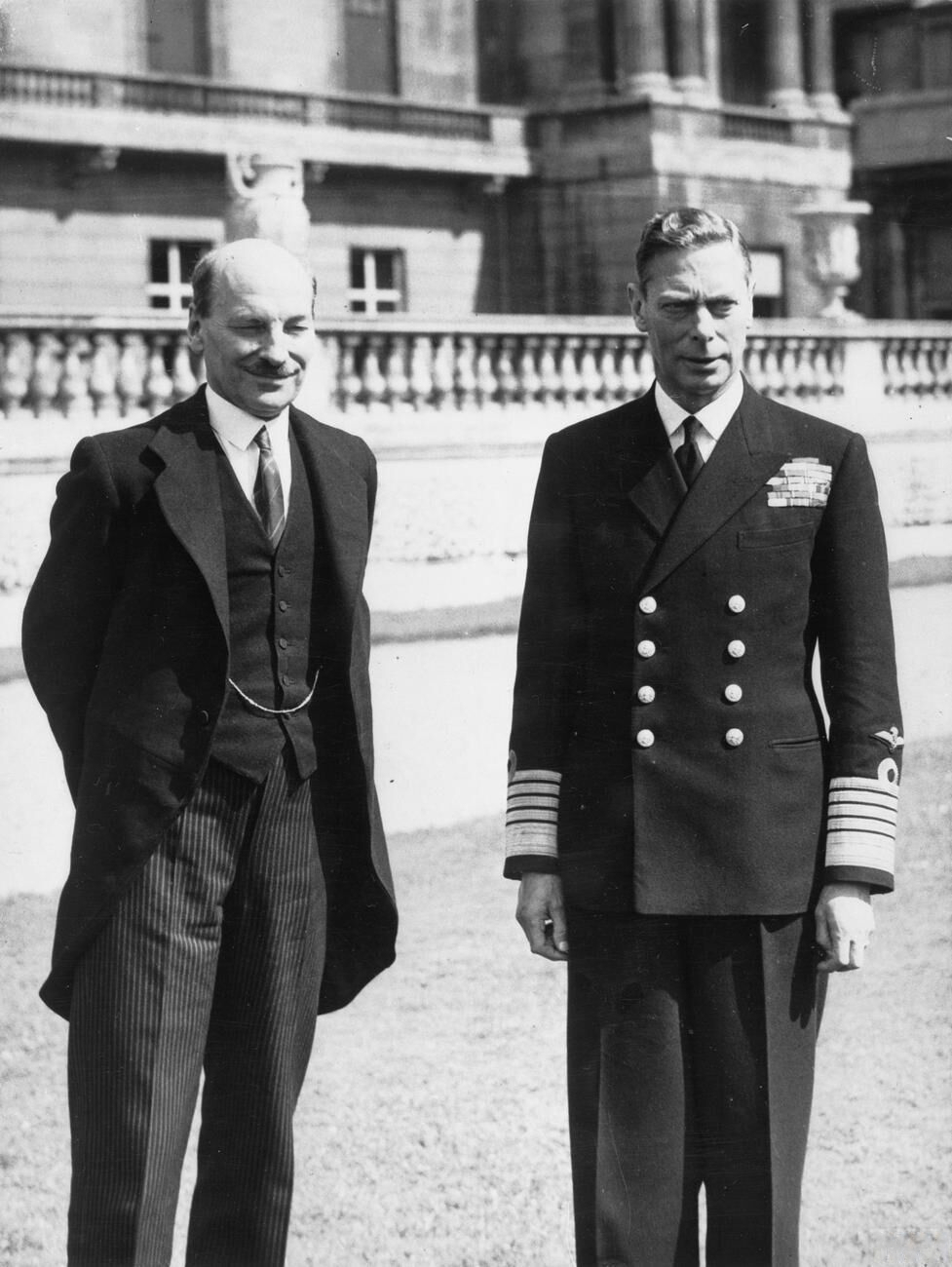
Prime Minister Clement Attlee (left) with King George VI. Attlee based the British post-World War II economic policy on Keynes' ideas.

While working on his General Theory, Keynes wrote to George Bernard Shaw, "I believe myself to be writing a book on economic theory which will largely revolutionize, not I suppose at once but in the course of the next ten years – the way the world thinks about economic problems. ... I don't merely hope what I say, in my own mind I'm quite sure." Keynes's ideas quickly became established as the new foundations for mainstream economics, and also as a leading inspiration for industrial nations economic policy makers from about 1941 to the midseventies, especially in the English speaking countries. The 1950s and 1960s period, when Keynes's influence was at its peak, to many appeared in retrospect to have been a golden age.

At that time, in contrast to the decades before WWII, the industrialized world and much of the developing world enjoyed high growth, low unemployment and an exceptionally low frequency of economic crises. In late 1965 Time magazine ran a cover article with the title inspired by Milton Friedman's statement, later associated with Richard Nixon, "We are all Keynesians now"; the article described the exceptionally favourable economic conditions then prevailing, and reported that "Washington's economic managers scaled these heights by their adherence to Keynes's central theme: the modern capitalist economy does not automatically work at top efficiency but can be raised to that level by the intervention and influence of the government." The article also states that Keynes was one of the three most important economists ever, and that his General Theory was more influential than the magna opera of his rivals, namely Adam Smith's The Wealth of Nations and Karl Marx's Das Kapital.

=== Displacement by monetarism and new classical economics 1979–1999 ===
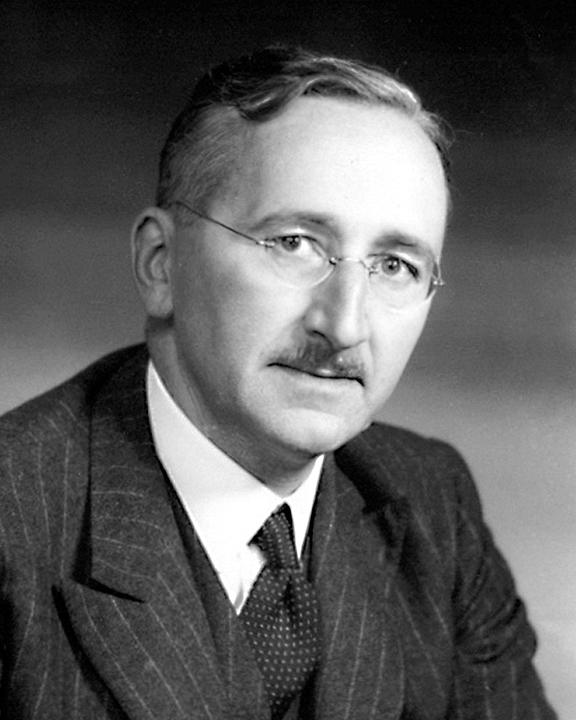
Friedrich Hayek, Keynes' leading contemporary critic. Milton Friedman began to take over this role by the late 1950s.

A swelling tide of criticism of Keynesian economics, most notably from Milton Friedman, a leading figure of monetarism, and the Austrian School's Friedrich Hayek, was unleashed by the stagflation of the 1970s. A series of events that contributed to this economic situation included Richard Nixon's imposition of wage and price controls on 15 August 1971 and unilateral cancellation of the Bretton Woods system in 1972, his ceasing the direct convertibility of the United States dollar to gold, as well as the 1973 oil crisis and the recession that followed.

In 1976, Robert Lucas of the Chicago school of economics introduced the Lucas critique, which called into question the logic behind Keynesian macroeconomic policy making. The new classical economics became the dominant school in macroeconomics. By the mid-1970s, policy makers were beginning to lose their confidence in the effectiveness of government intervention in the economy. In 1976 British Prime Minister James Callaghan said that the option of "spending our way out of recession" no longer exists. In 1979, the election of Margaret Thatcher as Prime Minister brought monetarism to British economic policy. In the United States, the Federal Reserve under Paul Volcker adopted similar policies of monetary tightening to control inflation.

In the world of practical policy-making as opposed to economics as an academic discipline, the monetarist experiments in both the United States and Britain in the early 1980s were the pinnacle of anti-Keynesian and the rise of perfect competition influence. The strong form of monetarism being tested at this time asserted that fiscal policy is of no effect, and that monetary policy should only try to target the money supply to control inflation, without attempting to target real interest rates. This was in contrast to the Keynesian view that monetary policy should target interest rates, which it held could influence unemployment. Monetarism succeeded in bringing down inflation but at the cost of unemployment rates in excess of 10%, causing the deepest recession seen in the developed countries since the end of the Great Depression and severe debt crises in the developing world. Contrary to monetarist predictions, the relationship between the money supply and the price level proved unreliable in the short- to medium-term. Another monetarist prediction not borne out in practice was that the velocity of money did not remain constant, and in fact dropped sharply. The Bank of England abandoned its sterling M3 money targeting in October 1985; the United States Federal Reserve began increasing the money supply above monetarist-advised thresholds with no effect on inflation, and discarded monetarism by 1984.

=== Keynesian counter currents 1999–2007 ===
By 1999, the 1997 Asian financial crisis and the harsh response by the International Monetary Fund (IMF) had at least partially discredited free market policies in the eyes of developing world policy makers. The developing world as a whole stopped running current account deficits in 1999, largely as a result of government interventions to devalue the countries' currencies, which would help build foreign reserves to protect against future crises and help them enjoy export led growth rather than relying on market forces.

For the advanced economies, while there was much talk of reforming the international financial system after the Asian crises, it was not until the market failure of the late 1990s and early 2000s dot-com bubble that there was a significant shift away from free market policies. In the United States, there was a return by the government of George W. Bush to a moderate form of Keynesian policy, with interest rates lowered to ease unemployment and head off recession, along with a form of fiscal intervention with emergency tax cuts to boost spending. In Britain, Chancellor of the Exchequer Gordon Brown had gone on record, saying "the real challenge was to interpret Keynes's insights for the modern world."

Yet American and British policy makers continued to ignore many elements of Keynesian thinking such as the recommendation to avoid large trade imbalances and to reduce government deficits in boom years. There was no general global return to Keynesian economics in the first 8 years of the 2000s. European policy became slightly more interventionist after the start of the 21st century, but the shift in a Keynesian direction was smaller than was the case for the United States and Britain; however, continental Europeans had not generally embraced free market thinking as wholeheartedly as had the English-speaking world in the 1980s and 1990s. Japan had been using moderate Keynesian policies in the nineties, and switched to neoliberalism with the government of Junichirō Koizumi in 2001–2006.

For the first half of the 2000s, free-market influences remained strong in powerful normative institutions like the World Bank, the IMF, and in prominent opinion-forming media, such as the Financial Times and The Economist. The Washington Consensus view that current account imbalances do not matter continued even in the face of a ballooning United States deficit, with mainstream academic opinion only turning to the view that the imbalances are unsustainable by 2007. Another notable anti-Keynesian view that remained dominant in United States and Britain policy making circles was the idea that markets work best if they are unregulated.

In the world of popular opinion, there had been an upsurge in vocal but minority opposition to the raw free market, with anti-globalization protests becoming increasingly notable after 1998. By 2007, there had been bestsellers promoting Keynesian or at least pro-mixed economy policies; among them were Naomi Klein's The Shock Doctrine and Song Hongbing's Currency Wars. In the academic world, the partial shift towards Keynesian policy had gone largely unnoticed.

== On Keynesian resurgence ==
In the wake of the 2008 financial crisis and the search for a way out of the crisis, a worldwide move toward Keynesian deficit financing and general resurgence of Keynesian policies resulted in a new economic consensus, which involved reassessment or even reversal of normative judgments on a number of topics. The Keynesian view receiving most attention has been fiscal stimulus, applied by numerous states as a response to the Great Recession. The IMF managing director Dominique Strauss-Kahn advocated for global fiscal stimulus already in January 2008.

Gordon Brown built support for fiscal stimulus among global leaders at September's UN General Assembly, after which he secured George Bush's agreement for the first G20 leaders summit. In late 2008 and 2009 fiscal stimulus packages were widely launched across the world, with packages in G20 countries averaging at about 2% of GDP, with a ratio of public spending to tax cuts of about 2:1. The stimulus in Europe was notably smaller than in large G20 countries elsewhere. Other areas where opinion has shifted back towards a Keynesian perspective include:

- Global trade imbalances. Keynes placed great importance on avoiding large trade deficits or surpluses; following the Keynesian displacement, an influential view in the West was that governments need not be concerned about them. From late 2008, imbalances are once again widely seen as an area for government concern. In October 2010, the United States suggested a possible plan to address global imbalances, with targets to limit current account surpluses similar to those proposed by Keynes at Bretton Woods.
- Capital controls. Keynes strongly favoured the use of controls to restrain international capital movement, especially short term speculative flows; in the 1970s and 1980s, opinion among Western economists and institutions swung firmly against them. During 2009 and 2010 capital controls once again came to be seen as an acceptable part of a government's macroeconomic policy toolkit, though institutions like the IMF still caution against overuse. In contrast to stimulus policies, the return to favour of capital controls still had the momentum as of late 2012.
- Skepticism concerning the role of mathematics in academic economics and in economic decision making. Despite his degree in mathematics, Keynes remained skeptical about the usefulness of mathematical models for solving economic problems. Mathematics became increasingly central to economics even during Keynes' career, and even more so in the decades following his death. While the Keynesian resurgence has seen no general reversal of opinion on the utility of complex math, there have been numerous calls for a broadening of economics to make further use of disciplines other than mathematics. In the practical spheres of banking and finance, there have been warnings against overreliance on mathematical models, which have been held up as one of the contributing causes of the 2008–2009 crises.

=== Among policy makers ===
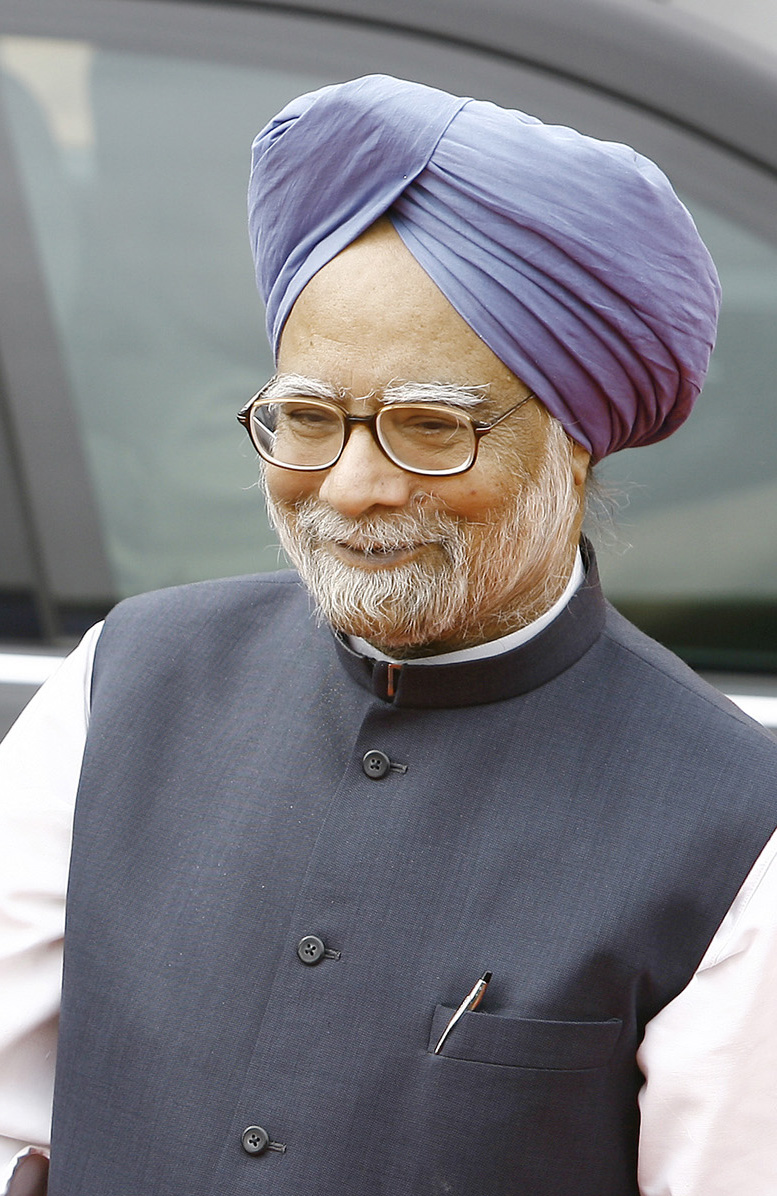
During his term as the 13th prime minister of India, economist Manmohan Singh spoke strongly in favour of Keynesian fiscal stimulus at the 2008 G-20 Washington summit.

In March 2008, leading free-market journalist Martin Wolf, chief economics commentator at the Financial Times, announced the death of the dream of global free-market capitalism, and quoted Josef Ackermann, chief executive of Deutsche Bank, as saying "I no longer believe in the market's self-healing power." Shortly afterward, economist Robert J. Shiller began advocating robust government intervention to tackle the financial crisis, citing Keynes. Macro economist James K. Galbraith used the 25th Annual Milton Friedman Distinguished Lecture to launch a sweeping attack against the consensus for monetarist economics and argued that Keynesian economics were far more relevant for tackling the emerging crises.

Much discussion among policy makers reflected Keynes's advocacy of international coordination of fiscal or monetary stimulus, and of international economic institutions such as the IMF and World Bank, which he had helped to create at Bretton Woods in 1944, and which many argued should be reformed at a "new Bretton Woods"; this was evident at the G20 and APEC meetings in Washington, D.C., and Lima, Peru in November 2008, and in coordinated reductions of interest rates by many countries in November and December 2008. IMF and United Nations economists and political leaders such as British Prime Minister Gordon Brown advocated a coordinated international approach to fiscal stimulus.

World Bank's President Robert Zoellick advocated that all developed countries pledge 0.7 percent of their stimulus package to a vulnerability fund for assisting developing countries. Donald Markwell and others argued that the absence of an effective international approach in the spirit of Keynes would risk a return of economic causes of international conflict, which Keynes had identified back in the 1930s.

The first nation to announce a substantial fiscal stimulus was Great Britain, with Chancellor Alistair Darling referring to Keynes as he unveiled plans for fiscal stimuli to head off the worst effects of recession. These measures were later described by Ed Balls as the first time a postwar British government had been able to meet a recession with a "classic Keynesian response". In his autobiography published in 2011, Darling recounts how his response to the crisis was "influenced hugely by Keynes's thinking, indeed, as were most other governments".

Darling's stimulus announcement was swiftly followed by a similar declaration from China, and over the next few weeks and months from European countries, the U.S. and other countries across the world. In a speech on 8 January 2009, President-elect Barack Obama unveiled a plan for extensive domestic spending to combat recession, further reflecting Keynesian thinking. The plan was signed by him on 17 February 2009. There had been extensive debate in United States Congress concerning the necessity, adequacy, and likely effects of the package, which was cut from $819 to $787 billion during its passage through the Senate.

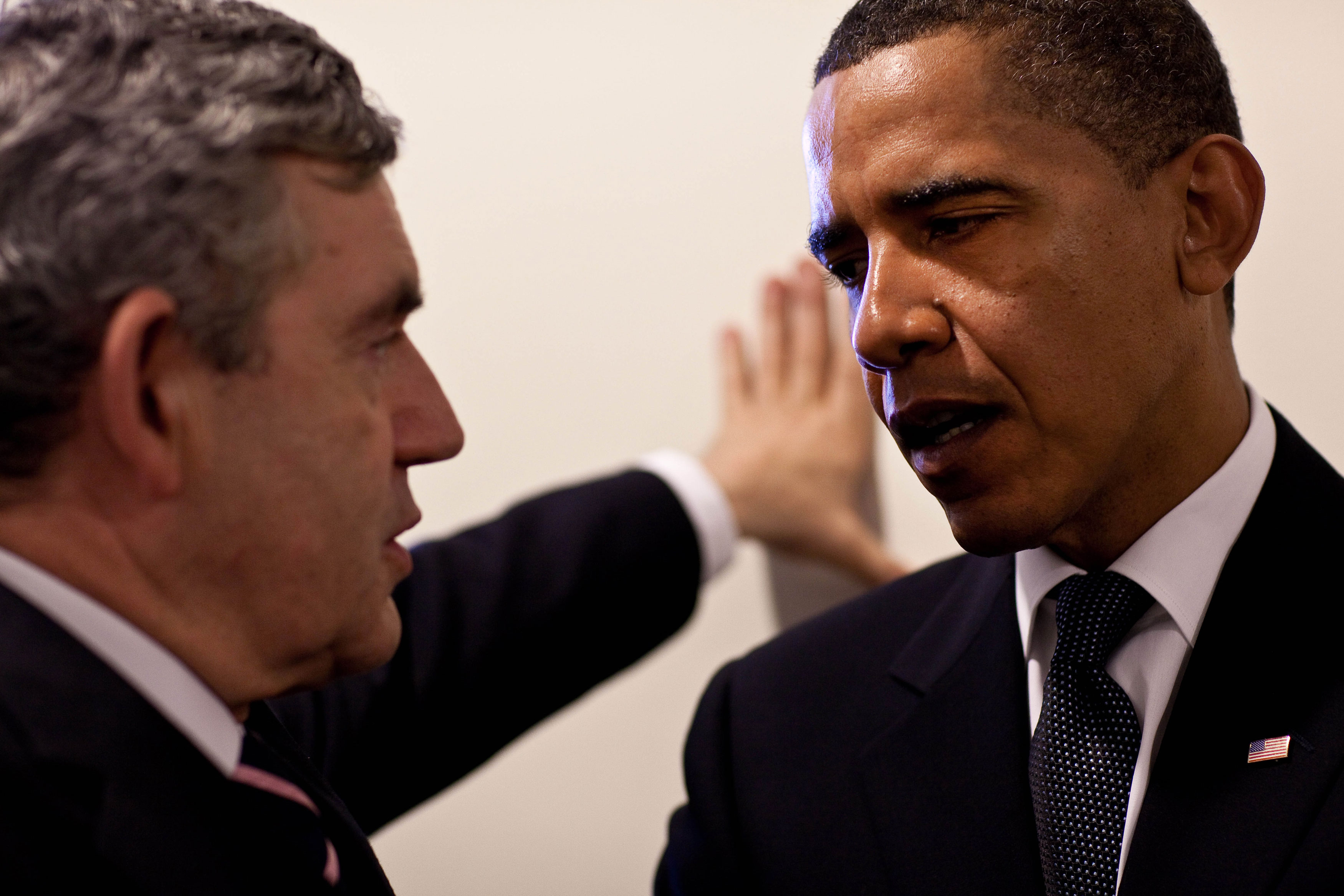
President Barack Obama confers with Prime Minister Gordon Brown following the United Nations Security Council meeting in New York in 2009.

On 21 January 21, 2010, the Volcker Rule was endorsed by President Obama. It was a proposal by United States economist Paul Volcker to restrict banks from making speculative investments that do not benefit their customers. Volcker had argued that such speculative activity played a key role in the recent worldwide financial crisis. Plans for a new $180 billion stimulus plan were announced by Obama in September 2010.

A renewed interest in Keynesian ideas was not limited to Western countries and stimulus plans were a common response to the crisis from nations across the globe. Stimulus packages in Asia were on a par with those in Europe and America. In a speech delivered in March 2009 entitled Reform the International Monetary System, Zhou Xiaochuan, the governor of the People's Bank of China, revived Keynes's idea of a centrally managed global reserve currency. Dr Zhou argued that it was unfortunate that Keynes's bancor proposal was not accepted at Bretton Woods in the 1940s. He argued that national currencies were unsuitable for use as global reserve currencies as a result of the Triffin dilemma and the difficulty faced by reserve currency issuers in trying to simultaneously achieve their domestic monetary policy goals and meet other countries' demand for reserve currency. Zhou proposed a gradual move towards adopting IMF special drawing rights (SDRs) as a centrally managed global reserve currency. Zhou's view was echoed in June 2009 by the IMF, and in September was described by the Financial Times as the boldest statement of the year to come from China.

In a widely read article on dollar hegemony published in Asia Times Online on 11 April 2002, Henry C.K. Liu asserted that "The Keynesian starting point is that full employment is the basis of good economics. It is through full employment at fair wages that all other economic inefficiencies can best be handled, through an accommodating monetary policy." Liu also advocated denominating Chinese exports in Chinese currency (RMB), as a step to free China from the constraints of excessive reliance on the dollar.

=== Efficacy ===
According to Anatole Kaletsky, Keynesian stimuli were rapidly followed by "revivals of growth in one country after another, roughly in proportion to the size of the various stimulus plans". China was one of the first nations to launch a substantial fiscal stimulus package, estimated at $586 billion spread over two years, and in February 2009 the Financial Times reported that both government officials and private investors were seeing signs of recovery, such as rises in commodity prices, a 13% rise in the Chinese stock market over a period of 10 days, and a big increase in lending, reflecting the government's success in using state-owned banks to inject liquidity into the real economy.

Reviewing events from 2010, economics commentator John Authers found that the stimulus and associated expansionary monetary policy had a dramatic effect in reviving the Chinese economy. The Shanghai index had been falling sharply since the September 2008 bankruptcy of Lehman Brothers, but the decline was halted when news of the planned stimulus leaked in late October. The day after the stimulus was officially announced, the Shanghai index immediately rose by 7.3%, followed by sustained growth. Speaking at the 2010 Summer Davos, Premier Wen Jiabao also credited the stimulus for good performance of the Chinese economy over the past two years.

As late as April 2009, central bankers and finance ministers remained cautious about the overall global economy; by May, the Financial Times was reporting that according to a package of leading indicators there were signs that recovery was imminent in Europe too, after a trough in March. The United States was one of the last major economies to implement a major stimulus plan, and the slowdown there looked set to continue for at least a few more months. There was also a rise in business and consumer confidence across most of Europe, and especially in the emerging economies such as Brazil, Russia and India.

In June, the Organisation for Economic Co-operation and Development (OECD) reported improvements in global economic outlook, with an overall growth forecast for 2010. The OECD gave the credit to stimulus plans, which they warned should not be rolled back too swiftly. The IMF also reported a better than expected global economic outlook in July, though warning that the recovery is likely to be slow. They credited the "unprecedented" global policy response and echoed the OECD in urging leaders to avoid complacency and not to unwind recession fighting fiscal and monetary policies too soon.

In a widely syndicated article published in August 2009, Paul Krugman announced that the world had been saved from the threat of a second great depression, thanks to "Big Government". The United States economy emerged from recession in the third quarter of 2009, which the Financial Times credited to the stimulus measures. In November, the managing director of the IMF Dominique Strauss-Kahn repeated the warning against terminating the stimulus measures too soon. The Financial Times reported that significant differences had emerged even within Europe, with senior members of the European Central Bank expressing concern about the risk of delaying the exit for too long.

On 8 December 2009, President Obama unveiled what the Financial Times described as a "second stimulus plan" for additional job creation using approximately $200 billion of unused funds that had been pre-approved for the Troubled Asset Relief Program. In the same speech he expressed the view that the initial stimulus had already saved or created 1.6 million jobs. In an article looking back at 2009, economist Arvind Subramanian wrote in the Financial Times that economics had helped to redeem itself by providing advice for the policy responses that successfully prevented a global slide into depression, with the fiscal policy stimulus measures taking their "cue from Keynes".

In July 2010, economics journalist Robin Harding wrote for the Financial Times that most American economists are in agreement regarding the large influence of the United States stimulus on the economy, although he mentioned high-profile dissenters such as Robert Barro and John B. Taylor. Barro's arguments against the effectiveness of the stimulus have been addressed by Keynesian economics professor J. Bradford DeLong.

A July 2010 paper by Moody's Investors Service's chief economist Mark Zandl and former Federal Reserve Vice Chairman Alan Blinder predicted that the United States recession would have been far worse without the government intervention. They calculate that in the absence of both a monetary and fiscal response, unemployment would have peaked at about 16.5% instead of about 10%, the peak to trough GDP decline would have been about 12% instead of 4%. Despite the lack of deficit spending, without the intervention the 2010 and 2011 United States federal budget deficit was forecast to be almost two times larger, due to the predicted collapse of tax receipts.

In August 2010, a report from the non-partisan Congressional Budget Office found the United States stimulus to have boosted growth by as much as 4.5%. House of Representatives Minority Leader John Boehner expressed skepticism about the report's accuracy. In March 2011, citing studies on the effectiveness of fiscal stimulus from several dozen economists and international bodies, David Romer told the IMF that "we should view the question of whether fiscal stimulus is effective as settled."

=== Calls for further extensions ===
In 2009, there were several books published by economists advocating a further shift towards Keynesian thinking. The authors advocated further reform in academic economics, policy making, and even the public's general ethics. Theoretical arguments regarding the relative merits of free market versus mixed economy policies do not always yield a clear conclusion. In his 2009 book Keynes: The Return of the Master, economic historian Lord Skidelsky has a chapter comparing the performance of the world economy between the "golden age" period of 1951–1973, when Keynesian policies were dominant, with the Washington Consensus period of 1981–2008, when free market policies were adopted by leading governments. Samuel Brittan of the Financial Times called this part of the book the key chapter for the practically inclined reader. Using data from the IMF, Skidelsky finds superior economic performance on a whole range of metrics, except for inflation where he says there was no significant difference.

Metric	Golden age period	Washington Consensus period
Average global growth	4.8%	3.2%
Average global inflation	3.9%	3.2%
Average unemployment (US)	4.8%	6.1%
Average unemployment (France)	1.2%	9.5%
Average unemployment (Germany)	3.1%	7.5%
Average unemployment (Great Britain)	1.6%	7.4%

Skidelsky suggests the high global growth during the golden age was especially impressive given that during that period Japan was the only major Asian economy enjoying high growth; the exceptional growth of China and other Asian emerging economies, raising the global average, happened later. He also comments that the golden age, compared with other periods, was substantially more stable. Martin Wolf found that in 1945–1971 (27 years) the world saw only 38 financial crises, whereas in 1973–1997 (24 years) there were 139. Skidelsky also reports that inequality was generally decreasing during the golden age, whereas since the Washington Consensus was formed it has been increasing. He notes that South America has been an exception to the general rise in inequality; since the late 1990s, inequality has been falling there, which James K. Galbraith explains as likely due to the region's early "retreat from neoliberal orthodoxy".

In his 2009 book The Keynes Solution, post-Keynesian economist Paul Davidson makes another historical case for the effectiveness of Keynesian policy, referring to the experience of the United States during the Great Depression. He notes how economic growth and employment levels increased for four successive years as the New Deal policies were pursued by President Roosevelt. When government spending was cut back in 1937 due to concerns about the budget deficit, all the gains were lost in one year, and growth only resumed after spending increased again from 1938, as a response to growing acceptance of deficit spending in a recession and later due to World War II. For Davidson, this experience validates the view that Keynesian policy has the power to deliver full employment and prosperity for a government's entire labor force. Davidson also wrote that both price stability and employment in the Keynesian age were superior even to the classical gold standard era that was terminated by World War I.

On 8 November 2008, Paul Davidson and Henry C.K. Liu co-authored an open letter to world leaders attending the November 15 White House summit on financial markets and world economy, urging reconsideration of Keynes' analytical system that contributed to the golden age of the first quarter century after World War II. The letter, signed by many supporting economists, advocates a new international financial architecture based on an updated 21st century version of the Keynes Plan originally proposed at Bretton Woods in 1944.

The letter ends by describing this new international financial architecture as aiming to create (1) a new global monetary regime that operates without currency hegemony, (2) global trade relationships that support rather than retard domestic development and (3) a global economic environment that promotes incentives for each nation to promote full employment and raise wages for its labor force.

== In academia ==
A marked shift towards Keynesian thinking took place among prominent economists. Some, such as Paul Krugman, James Galbraith and Brad Delong, were already Keynesians but in 2008 began to get considerably more attention for their advocacy of Keynesian policy. Others, such as Richard Posner and Martin Feldstein, had previously been associated with anti-Keynesian thinking, yet by 2009 publicly converted to Keynesian economics, which made considerable impact on other economists. Posner's 2009 book, A Failure of Capitalism, was a critique of laissez-faire capitalism and its ideologues.

This shift towards Keynesian thinking was widely shared by many politically active economists across the world. In the years leading up to the resurgence, Germany had been home to some of the most outspoken critics of Keynesianism, yet according to economist Sebastian Dullien writing in December 2008, "important voices in the German economic profession are now calling for a large stimulus package, passed as quickly as possible". The New York Times reported that in the March 2008 annual meeting of the American Economic Association, economists had remained hostile or at least sceptical about the government’s role in enhancing the market sector or mitigating recession with fiscal stimulus. But already during the January 2009 meeting virtually everyone voiced their support for such measures.

There were a few high-profile known dissenter economists, such as Robert Barro and Eugene Fama, but in 2008 and early 2009 their objections had little influence on the mainstream debate. A dissenter from Germany had been Stefan Homburg, who in January 2009 complained "I simply cannot understand how so many economics professors have done a complete U-turn. Have they all gone mad?" Among the less publicly prominent economists, who tend to debate only with their fellows and write mainly in technical journals, a substantial shift in opinion was less obvious. Speaking in March 2009, Galbraith stated that he had not detected any changes among academic economists, nor a re-examination of orthodox opinion in the journals.

Until 2008, the consensus among most mainstream economists was that fiscal stimulus did not work. New Keynesians and New Classical economists had previously agreed monetary policy was sufficient for most downturns and the two schools of thought debated only technicalities. The extent of the recession made the New Keynesians re-evaluate the potential of large stimulus, and their debates with New Classical economists, who often opposed stimulus entirely, became substantive. Some economists (primarily post-Keynesians) accused the New Keynesian system of being so integrated with pro-free market neo-classical influences that the label 'Keynesian' in this case could be considered a misnomer.

The 2008 financial crisis has led economists to pay greater attention to Keynes's original theories. In February 2009, Robert Shiller and George Akerlof argued in their book Animal Spirits that the current United States stimulus package was too small, because it did not take into account loss of confidence or do enough to restore the availability of credit. In a September 2009 article for The New York Times, on the lessons economists should learn from the crisis, Krugman urged economists to move away from neoclassical models and employ Keynesian analysis, writing:

So here's what I think economists have to do. First, they have to face up to the inconvenient reality that financial markets fall far short of perfection, that they are subject to extraordinary delusions and the madness of crowds. Second, they have to admit ... that Keynesian economics remains the best framework we have for making sense of recessions and depressions. Third, they'll have to do their best to incorporate the realities of finance into macroeconomics.

By mid-2010, interest in Keynes' ideas was still growing within academia, even though the apparent consensus among prominent economists had fractured and the revival in Keynesian policy making had to some degree stalled.

In October 2011, journalist John Cassidy noted the large number of new books that had recently come out about Keynes, including from leading universities such as Cambridge and MIT, with more books due to come out towards the end of that year.

== Criticism ==
Keynesian ideas also attracted considerable criticism in this time period. While from late 2008 to early 2010 there was broad consensus among international leaders concerning the need for coordinated stimulus, the German administration initially stood out in their reluctance to fully embrace Keynesian policy. In December 2008, Finance Minister Peer Steinbrück of Germany criticised Gordon Brown's advocacy of Keynesian stimulus, saying "The switch from decades of supply-side politics all the way to a crass Keynesianism is breathtaking." By the end of January 2009, Germany had announced a second stimulus plan which, relative to GDP, was larger than Britain's. George Osborne, at the time shadow British chancellor, opposed a return to Keynesian policy from as early as October 2008, saying "even a modest dose of Keynesian spending" could act as a "cruise missile aimed at the heart of recovery."

Critics argued that Keynesian policy would be counter-productive for the reasons of being inflationary, creating more income disparity, and causing consumers to rein in their spending even more as they anticipated future tax increases. In 2009, more than 300 professional economists, led by three Nobel laureates in economics, James M. Buchanan, Edward C. Prescott, and Vernon L. Smith, signed a statement against more government spending, arguing that "Lower tax rates and a reduction in the burden of government are the best ways of using fiscal policy to boost growth."

Robert Barro, an economics professor at Harvard University (author of the 1974 Ricardian equivalence hypothesis postulating that government stimuli are inefficient in a perfect market), argued that the United States stimulus spending might be unwise because of one of the factors the American Recovery and Reinvestment Act of 2009 depended on for its effectiveness, the "multiplier effect"; the fiscal multiplier, required to be over the value of one for the effect to take place, was in practice close to zero, not 1.5, as he said the Obama team were assuming, which means the extra employment generated by the stimulus would be cancelled out by less output and investment in the private sector. A group of German economists had also argued that the size of the multiplier effect was overestimated, while the Memorandum Group of German Economics Professors claimed the opposite and demanded a larger stimulus.

Economist Edward Prescott (author of the real business-cycle model that post-Keynesians hold failed to forecast the crisis) and economist Eugene Fama argued that stimulus plans are unlikely to have a net positive effect on employment, and may even harm it. Economist Jeffrey Sachs doubted a positive effect because the stimulus and associated policies "may work in the short term but they threaten to produce still greater crises within a few years". In a June 2010 article, referring to the cooling of enthusiasm for further stimulus found among policy makers at the 2010 G-20 Toronto summit, Sachs declared that Keynesian economics is facing its "last hurrah".

There have also been arguments that the Great Recession of the early 21st century was caused not by excessively free markets but by the remnants of Keynesian policy. Luigi Zingales of the University of Chicago argued that "Keynesianism is just a convenient ideology to hide corruption and political patronage". In February 2009, Alan Reynolds, senior fellow at the Cato Institute, acknowledged the Keynesian resurgence but stated that evidence from various studies suggest Keynesian remedies will be ineffective and Keynesian advocates appear to be driven by blind faith. In 2009, historian Thomas Woods, an adherent to the Austrian school of economics, published the book Meltdown, which places blame for the crisis on government intervention and points to the Federal Reserve as the primary culprit behind the financial calamity.

Professor John Bellamy Foster, a sociologist, questioned whether the resurgence had been truly Keynesian in character. He suggested those few economists he regards as genuinely progressive, such as James Galbraith, were now far from the centre of government. He also asserted that it is Karl Marx, not Keynes, that society should look to for a full solution to economic problems.

== Aftermath: 2010 and later ==
According to Henry Farrell and John Quiggin, the previous apparent consensus for Keynesian policy among prominent economists by late 2009 began to dissolve into dissensus. There was no reversal to the previous free-market consensus, but the apparent unity of the previous year had gone. In part this was due to objections from anti-Keynesians like Robert Barro attracting wider attention, in part to the intervention of elite economists who had previously kept out of the debate, specifically from the ECB but also others, including Jeffery Sachs. The lack of consensus among expert opinion made policy makers vulnerable to calls for abandonment of Keynesian policy in favour of fiscal consolidation.

In April 2010, a communiqué from the Washington meeting of finance ministers called for continuation of the stimulus policies until the recovery is firmly entrenched with strong private sector activity, though it accepted that some countries had already begun to exit from the policies. By mid-2010, the earlier global consensus for ongoing Keynesian stimulus had fractured, mirroring the "dissensus" that had emerged among prominent economists. Especially in Europe, there was an increase in rhetoric calling for immediate fiscal tightening, following events such as the Greek debt crisis and the displacement in Britain of the Labour government with a coalition dominated by the Conservatives after the May 2010 elections. While some high level officials, particularly from the United States and India, continued advocating sustained stimulus until the global recovery is better established, a communiqué from the G20, issued after their June 2010 meeting of finance ministers in Busan, welcomed the trend towards fiscal consolidation rather than further deficit financed stimulus. The G20 did reiterate that forceful government intervention had been the correct response in 2008 and 2009. Then IMF managing director Dominique Strauss-Kahn, who had been a leading advocate for stimulus spending from as early as January 2008, said he was comfortable with the reversal.

European political leaders embarked on substantial austerity drives. In July 2010, leading European economic policy maker Jean-Claude Trichet, president of the ECB, stated that it was time for all industrial nations to stop stimulating and start tightening. Keynesian economists and Keynes biographer Lord Skidelsky contested the move to implement cuts given the still fragile economy. In a July 2010 article, Financial Times columnist Philip Stephens argued that recent events show the markets to have re-established themselves as leading influences on western economic policy, while Brad DeLong wrote that he considered himself and fellow Keynesians to have lost the argument for fiscal stimulus.

In April 2011, Professor Patrick Dunleavy wrote that the resurgence has caused a "backlash against the State", starting in America with movements like the Tea Party and later spreading to Europe. He also stated it is likely that ideological wars between rival economic world views have returned for good. In September, Steven Rattner opined that the 2012 United States presidential election was shaping up to be a contest between the economic policies of Keynes and Friedrich Hayek, or "a clash of ideologies the likes of which America has not seen in decades." Republican candidates openly praised Hayek and Ludwig von Mises. According to Rattner, while the Democrats economic strategy remained largely based on Keynes, the economist's name was now rarely mentioned; Keynes had become an almost politically toxic word due to the extensive criticism of the 2009 Keynesian stimulus. Rattner refers to the work of Alan Blinder and Mark Zandi, which determined that the 2009 United States stimulus saved about 8.5 million jobs, and with Obama's third stimulus, a $450 billion Jobs plan was projected to create 1.9 million jobs in 2012. Also in September, President of the European Commission José Manuel Barroso called for additional fiscal policy to boost economic growth, while recognizing many European countries did not at that time have the capability to launch a substantial stimulus program. German Chancellor Angela Merkel rejected the idea of further stimulus.

By November 2011, efforts to pass Obama's American Jobs Act had been rejected by the United States Congress. In Britain, David Cameron made a speech in which he recognized a deteriorating economic outlook but said those arguing for traditional fiscal stimulus were "dangerously wrong". Simon Cox, Asia economics editor for The Economist, predicted that while China might face future economic challenges, the incoming leaders expected to take over the top positions in late 2012 ( Xi Jinping and Li Keqiang ) were far less likely than their predecessor to respond with Keynesian policies. Also in November, The Courageous State book was released by the anti-tax evasion campaigner Richard Murphy, calling for a revival of the Keynesian resurgence, which he argues is the best economic policy for the interests of ordinary people. Murphy sees the resurgence as having faded out by late 2009. Influential figures that had come out against Keynesian policy, even from left of center politics, include the UK Labour Party's Maurice Glasman, whose favorite economist is Hayek, and the diplomat Carne Ross, who asserted that no form of centralized authority can meet the problems of the modern world, arguing for an anti-statist form of participatory democracy instead.

In January 2012, Philip Stephens repeated his earlier view that the markets once again have decisive influence on economic policy making, also noting a decline in the public's trust in government in both Europe and the US, along with greater concern over public debt. In March however, while accepting that the resurgence had stalled, Paul Krugman expressed optimism about the long term prospects of achieving a lasting shift towards Keynesianism in both mainstream economics and policy making. In May, Krugman published the book End this Depression Now!, where he repeated his calls for greater use of fiscal stimulus, though according to the Financial Times his proposals were both "modest" and "cautious", reflecting the resistance to such measures since the end of resurgence.

In June, Krugman and Richard Layard launched A manifesto for economic sense, where they call for greater use of stimulatory fiscal policy to reduce unemployment and boost growth. By mid-2012, with the ongoing Euro crisis and persistent high unemployment in the US, there had been renewed consideration of stimulus policies by European and American policy makers but no return to the pro-stimulus consensus that existed in 2009. After the 2012 G8 summit, leaders issued a statement recognising the range of opinions concerning the best measures to strengthen their economies.

In January 2013, Japan's recently elected conservative government announced a ten trillion yen Keynesian stimulus package, which was to include public works and create an expected 600,000 new jobs. At the same time, the Financial Times published Wolfgang Münchau's article "US joins misguided pursuit of austerity", as the United States was abandoning the relatively stimulatory policy it had adopted prior to 2013, repeating, in the author's view, Europe's mistake. In July 2013, Philip Mirowski wrote that not only had the Keynesian resurgence subsided but the rival economic orientation of neoliberalism had emerged from the financial crisis stronger than ever.

In May 2016, three IMF economists published new research findings and criticized some of the fundamental assumptions of the neoliberal doctrine. They warned that austerity policies could do more harm than good because of their social costs, such as increased inequality, which "in turn hurts the level and sustainability of growth". Speaking of capital account liberalization, that is unrestricted movement of capital across international borders ("openness") and fiscal consolidation, meaning policies to reduce fiscal deficits and debt levels ("austerity"), they wrote: "Since both openness and austerity are associated with increasing income inequality, this distributional effect sets up an adverse feedback loop. The increase in inequality engendered by financial openness and austerity might itself undercut growth, the very thing that the neoliberal agenda is intent on boosting. There is now strong evidence that inequality can significantly lower both the level and the durability of growth". Additionally, they recommended actively combating inequality by redistributing wealth via taxes and government spending, noting "the evidence of the economic damage from inequality suggests that policymakers should be more open to redistribution than they are" and "the fear that such policies will themselves necessarily hurt growth is unfounded".

By October 2016, there had been recent increases in fiscal stimulus for many countries, along with calls for this return to fiscal stimulus and demand management policies to increase further, or at least for further research into clarifying the scope for such policies to be effective. Among these who made such calls were the IMF, Janet Yellen, and senior White House economist Jason Furman. While some economists and government policy makers remain sceptical, Martin Sandbu for the Financial Times said a return to Keynes original positive views about demand management is underway. Sandbu calls this "paleo-Keynesianism" to differentiate from "new Keynesianism" thinking which had relatively little to say in favour of state intervention in the economy.

== See also ==
- History of macroeconomic thought
- Volcker Rule
