= Wallace neutrality =

Economic hypothesis

The Wallace neutrality (also known as Wallace Irrelevance Proposition, Modigliani–Miller theorem for government finance), is an economics proposition asserting that in certain environment, holding fiscal policy constant, alternative paths of the government financial policies have no effect on the sequences for the price level and for real allocations in the economy. The proposition rests upon a no arbitrage argument similar to that of the Modigliani–Miller theorem. Policy implication is that, whenever Wallace neutrality applies, conventional open-market purchases of securities by the central bank won't be an effective monetary policy.

== History ==
The concept of Wallace neutrality was first introduced by Neil Wallace (Wallace (1981)). However the irrelevance proposition proved by Wallace is restricted to a simple environment, leaving the question open of how broad the class of environments is in which the conclusion holds. A series of similar results, under different environments, were obtained in the 1980s. However, these results remain in contexts where money is not dominated as a rate of return. Sargent and Smith (1987) studied an environment and a structure of restrictions on trades in which government-issued currency is dominated as a rate of return and do conclude that open market operations are irrelevant.

Early analysis is often supposed to be of little practical relevance for actual monetary policy because money being dominated as a rate of return by short-term Treasury securities is routinely observed, which invalidates Wallace's result. However, as noted in Eggertsson and Woodford (2003), in the case of open-market operations that are conducted at the zero bound, the liquidity services provided by money balances at the margin have fallen to zero, so that an analysis of the kind proposed by Wallace is still correct. They also applied the Wallace irrelevance proposition to government purchases of long term debt in a representative-household model.

Cúrdia and Woodford (2011) argued that only two assumptions are needed for Wallace neutrality to hold

- the assets in question are valued only for their pecuniary returns
- all investors can purchase arbitrary quantities of the same assets at the same (market) prices.

They also found that the Wallace irrelevance proposition weakly holds under certain relaxed assumptions.

There are also recent works which invalidate Wallace irrelevance based on different relaxed assumptions and novel mechanisms. For example, in Andrew Nowobilski's (2012) paper, open market operations powerfully influence economic outcomes due to the introduction of a financial sector engaging in liquidity transformation. In Stefan Homburg's (2015) superneutrality article, open market operations leave real variables unaffected but influence nominal variables in a non-trivial fashion. In a recent paper, Wei Cui and Vincent Sterk (2018) showed that Wallace neutrality does not hold in HANK models with assets with different degrees of liquidity, as the marginal propensity to consume out of liquid wealth is way larger than the marginal propensity to consume out of illiquid wealth.

== See also ==
- Ricardian equivalence
- Modigliani–Miller theorem
- Monetary policy
- Open market operation
- Federal funds rate
- Zero interest rate policy
- Liquidity trap
- Balance sheet
- Quantitative easing
- Real interest rate
- Government spending
