= Money and Government =

2018 book by Robert Skidelsky

- First edition
- Author: Robert Skidelsky
- Subject: History of economics
- Publisher: Allen Lane (UK)
- Publication date: September 2018
- Pages: 512
- ISBN: 9780300240320

Money and Government: The Past and Future of Economics is a 2018 book about the history of economics by Robert Skidelsky.
