= Keynes: The Return of the Master =

2009 book by Robert Skidelsky

- The book's front cover, illustrated by Sir David Low
- Author: Robert Skidelsky
- Language: English
- Subject: Economics
- Publisher: Allen Lane
- Publication date: September 2009
- Publication place: United Kingdom
- Media type: Hardcover
- ISBN: 978-1-84614-258-1
- OCLC: 373483182

Keynes: The Return of the Master is a 2009 book by economic historian Robert Skidelsky. The work discusses the economic theories and philosophy of John Maynard Keynes, and argues about their relevance to the world following the 2008 financial crisis. In contrast to the 30 years he needed to write his prize-winning biography on Keynes, the author was able to write this 240-page book in only three months.

== Synopsis ==
The book is divided into a preface, an introduction and three main parts which include a total of eight chapters. The preface introduces Skidelsky's broad themes. In addition to the relevance of Keynes's economics due to the crisis, the author talks about the newly energised questioning concerning wider issues such as the role of morality in 21st-century life and on how Keynes's philosophy and ethics might offer an answer. The introduction maps out the ground the book will cover - the rise of Keynesianism from the late 1930s; its fall in the 1970s; the subsequent rise of free-market-friendly economics, which Skidelsky considers suffers from a regressive over-reliance on maths; the discrediting of this form of economics by the late 2000s crises and the new relevance of Keynes.

=== Part 1 - "The Crisis" ===
Chapter 1 includes a thumbnail sketch of the unfolding events that comprise the 2007–2009 crises, a brief discussion of the government response and an outline of the various causes, along with a summary of how they have been covered in the media. The crises are described as the deflation of the asset bubble once confidence was undermined in key underlying factors: American house prices and the creditworthiness of sub-prime mortgages. Following on from this was the liquidity crunch in the world of finance, with the knock-on effect on the real economy. Lord Skidelsky divides his discussion of the response into two sections, covering the bail-outs and the stimulus packages. He identifies the following possible causes: financial innovation; lack of regulation; the behaviour of the bankers & hedge funds and the failings of both credit-rating agencies and governments. He finishes by asserting that all these actors are influenced by economic theories and that it is recent trends in economics that are the real cause of the crises.

Chapter 2 is about economics as it has been practised in the years leading up to 2009. The author refers to Keynes's view that an over-reliance on maths is a mistake because mathematical models will always depend on the validity of their underlying assumptions. Skidelsky says that modern mainstream macroeconomics has become closely integrated with maths, at the expense of other disciplines such as political economy and history, and that this is partly why it became so unreliable at making accurate predictions or offering good advice. Various schools of thought within modern economics are briefly discussed, such as rational expectations, real business cycle theory and efficient market theory.

=== Part 2 - "The Rise and Fall of Keynesian Economics" ===
Chapter 3 has a brief biographical sketch of Keynes's life, especially as it relates to his economics. Attention is paid especially to Keynes's direct involvement with the markets as a private investor and consultant for others, his involvement with academic economics and his dealings with government policy-makers.

Chapter 4 focuses on Keynes's economics, in particular in the evolution of his thinking and how he challenged mainstream thinking. There is an emphasis on the high importance Keynes placed on the role of uncertainty; his central insight that demand, not supply, is the key factor governing unemployment; and Keynes's principal policy recommendation that the rate of interest be kept permanently low so that a high proportion of savings will be channelled into job-creating investment.

Chapter 5 begins with a discussion of the displacement of Keynesian economics by rival theories promoted by Milton Friedman and others. The chapter goes on to compare the Golden Age of Capitalism (1951–1973), where the Keynesian policy was widely followed by the world's governments, with the Washington Consensus (1980–2009) period. Skidelsky finds that the golden age benefited from considerably higher economic growth, lower unemployment and inequality, without significantly higher inflation. The author discusses various arguments concerning to what extent the exceptional global conditions of the golden age were due to Keynes's influence and concludes that to a large degree the "old coach" was responsible.

=== Part 3 - "The return of Keynes" ===
Chapter 6 concerns Keynes's philosophical and ethical views, and how they relate to our current conception and practice of capitalism. Skidelsky asserts that central to current thinking and praxis is Negative liberty - the idea that society and those who govern it ought not to make any judgement about what is desirable for people, but just leave individuals as free as possible to pursue their aims, whatever those may be. With relation to the economy, the current mainstream view sees capitalism as an end in itself, the expression of a population's will relayed via the market. This is contrasted with Keynes's view that capitalism is a means rather than an end, and ought to aim at allowing populations the leisure to pursue the "good life" chiefly living ethically, and having time for the appreciation of beauty and the pleasures of human intercourse.

Chapter 7 is about Keynes's political thinking. In particular, it focuses on his doctrine of prudence, which follows on from Keynes's views on uncertainty. Keynes held that, as the long-term future is very hard to predict, it is very rarely justified for politicians to implement policies that cause short-term pain to their populations for possible long-term gains.

Chapter 8 sums up Keynes's relevance to the current age as of 2009. The author suggests that Keynes would likely advise us to rethink macroeconomic policy, with a greater emphasis on balanced growth and with a somewhat large role for government in ensuring there is a smooth flow of investment to help protect the economy from unpredictable shocks. Macroeconomics should be reformed so that it again recognises the role of uncertainty and so it draws on other areas of knowledge such as history and International political economy, with a less central role for maths. The global savings glut needs to be addressed. Ethics should once again have a role in guiding capitalism, as should Keynes's vision of harmony, where differences are cherished rather than pressured to conform, as can be the case with current concepts of "social cohesion" and "consensus".

== Reception ==
Roy Hattersley in The Guardian describes the work as a "wonderfully lucid exposition of complicated ideas" and says that it "ought to be required reading for every prospective minister". Hattersley sums up the book's theme as follows: "The message is that Keynes is back, not just as a name to be invoked when convenient, but as a guide through the perilous years that lie ahead." Dwight Garner in the New York Times writes a positive review but notes that the pace can slow down when figures are introduced. He adds that the book can be considered as aimed at the general reader only "if that general reader owns excellent reading glasses and enthusiastically devours the daily business section from front to back."

Carlos Lozada agrees with one of the book's premises by stating:

Thanks to the Great Recession, we're no longer talking about "rational expectations" or the "efficient markets hypothesis." Instead, it's all about stimulus packages, federal spending and G-20 summits. In other words, it's all about Keynes.

However, Lozada also suggests that the ideas of economists might not be as central to running the world as members of the profession like to think. Some reviewers cast doubts on Skidelsky's hopes that lasting changes based on Keynes's works will occur. Sean O'Grady from The Independent says that Skidelsky lacks the exceptional persuasive appeal that Keynes himself had while alive. The Scotsman's Bill Jamieson writes that there could be no better champion for Keynes and his relevance to the current age than Robert Skidelsky. But he suggests that some of the solutions currently required demand an understanding of how to micro-manage risk-taking by bankers, a subject on which Keynes had little to say, and also of the "risk-taking entrepreneur". The latter topic was better covered by Joseph Schumpeter, who Jamieson says should rank at least equal to Keynes as our guide to future economic thinking. Writing for the New Statesman, Cambridge professor Andrew Gamble says that the book is "very valuable for reminding us of Keynes's towering contribution as a political economist, the breadth of his interests and the subtlety of his thought." But he goes on to say that "the political conditions for a real return of Keynes still seem quite distant."

N. Gregory Mankiw in The Wall Street Journal praises Skidelsky for biographical work, but finds his economic knowledge "pedestrian and imprecise".

=== Other reviews ===
- Stiglitz, Joseph (22 April 2010). "The Non-Existent Hand". London Review of Books. 32 (8): 17–18.

== See also ==
- Commanding Heights
- 2008–2009 Keynesian resurgence
