= John Maynard Keynes (Skidelsky) =

John Maynard Keynes is a biography of John Maynard Keynes, written by Robert Skidelsky. It is published in three volumes.

== Content ==
Vol. 1. Hopes Betrayed 1833-1920 (1983) focuses on Keynes's early life, education, and his emergence as a public intellectual during World War I. Vol. 2. The Economist as Saviour, 1920-37 (1992) covers Keynes's contributions to economics, his involvement in international affairs, and his rise to a prominent economist. Vol. 3 Fighting for Britain, 1937-1946 (2000) is about Keynes's role in World War II and his efforts in shaping the post-war international economic order, particularly through the Bretton Woods Conference. Compiled and abridged one-volume edition is published in 2003.

== Reception ==
According to Martin J. Wiener's review, volume 1 covers his family background, his time at Eton and Cambridge, his involvement with the Bloomsbury Group, and his work in the British Treasury. It shows how much Roy Harrod left out in his biography, such as his homosexuality, his application for conscientious objector status, his financial speculations, and his Bloomsbury irreverence to accepted moral standards. It stresses Keynes's lack of interest before World War I in social reform, and his slowness to commit himself to economics.

Geoffrey Harcourt states Skidelsky writes Keynes's marriage to Lydia Lopokova was watershed of his intellectual and personal life. Skidelsky emphasises parts of A Treatise on Money relevant for the making of The General Theory. The narrative is set out by Skidelsky and its development is related to Keynes's activities, for example, his work for the Liberal Party, the Macmillan Committee and other government bodies. For Skidelsky, the vision that ties Keynes' life together is of a person who challenged Victorian society and strove for a civilized society where the good life could be enjoyed by all.

J. Bradford DeLong states there are "a few places in Fighting for Britain where Skidelsky seems to me to lose his way.", for example, overstating the gap between Keynes and Harry Dexter White. But DeLong concluded these "do not greatly mar his achievement. The meat of the biography lies in the amazingly well-constructed narrative, and in the magnificent portraits of Keynes and his age." David Vines thinks that Keynes's contributions to the development of international macroeconomics, important as any of his other accomplishments as an economist according to Vines, is not fully addressed in Skidelsky's work.
