= How Much is Enough?: Money and the Good Life =

Book by Robert Skidelsky

- First edition
- Author: Robert Skidelsky, Edward Skidelsky
- Language: English
- Genre: Non-fiction
- Publisher: Other Press
- Publication date: 2012

How Much is Enough?: Money and the Good Life is a 2012 popular economics book by Robert Skidelsky and Edward Skidelsky. It was published initially by Other Press and later by Penguin Books.

The book asks why Westerners work so many hours per week and lead lives that revolve around money, business and financial decisions in defiance of John Maynard Keynes' 1930 assertion that there would come a time (around 2015) when capitalism would be able to provide for all our needs and the work week would drop to 10 or even 5 hours.

The book (and Edward Skidelsky's writing generally) looks into the idea of the good life and how capitalism may have been the key to it, but we have now lost sense of the good life as a priority.

The solutions offered to this problem are to "curb insatiability" and to consider a form of basic income for society.

== Reception ==
"The over-all thrust of their polemic is a welcome call to reinvigorate society's ethical aspect and bring about the good life for everyone." —The New Yorker

"How Much Is Enough? is a delightful book. It addresses a Big Question without the jargon and obfuscation that pollutes so much philosophy. The prose is lucid, and all the relevant issues are raised and addressed." —The Wall Street Journal

"The authors turn to historical fiction, philosophy, and political theory, drawing on Faust, Marx's critique of capitalism, and Aristotle's uses of wealth. Their conclusion that concepts like respect, friendship, and community are more likely to contribute to satisfaction and overall happiness than wealth makes for a fascinating, if cerebral, read." —Publishers Weekly

"The Skidelskys move seamlessly from the abstract to the concrete; from philosophy to public policy." —The Independent

Richard Posner, in his review for The New York Times, disagreed with both the book's concept of leisure and its proposition that more leisure time would lead to overall personal betterment.
