= Robert Skidelsky =

British historian and economist (1939–2026)

The Right Honourable The Lord Skidelsky FBA FRHistS FRSL
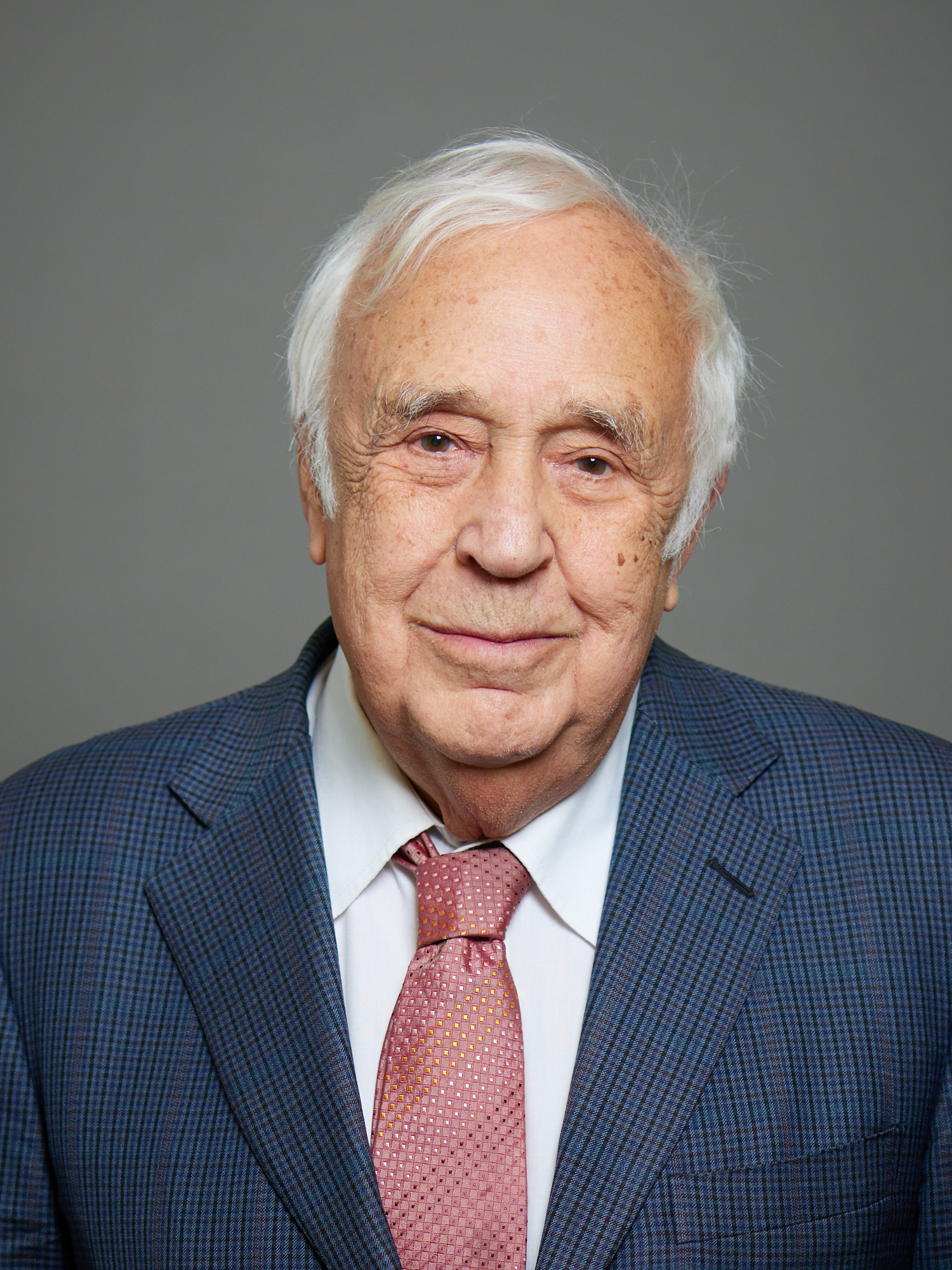
- Official portrait, 2022

Member of the House of Lords
- Lord Temporal
- Life peerage 15 July 1991 – 15 April 2026

Personal details
- Born: Robert Jacob Alexander Skidelsky; 25 April 1939 Harbin, Manchukuo (today part of Heilongjiang, China)
- Died: 15 April 2026 (aged 86) East Sussex, England, United Kingdom
- Party: Independent (Crossbench)
- Other political affiliations: Labour (until 1981); SDP (1981–88); SDP (first revival) (1988–90); Conservative (1992–2001)
- Education: Jesus College, Oxford; Nuffield College, Oxford
- Website: Official website

Robert Jacob Alexander Skidelsky, Baron Skidelsky, FBA, FRHistS, FRSL (25 April 1939 – 15 April 2026) was a British economic historian, author and crossbench life peer in the House of Lords. He is best known for his award-winning three-volume biography of John Maynard Keynes, regarded as the definitive study of the economist's life and work. Educated at Jesus College, Oxford, he held academic posts in history and political economy at several universities and was Emeritus Professor of Political Economy at the University of Warwick. Beyond academia, Skidelsky was influential in British public policy debates, serving as the founding chairman of the Social Market Foundation and writing extensively on economics, fiscal policy, and the political implications of technological change.

== Early life ==
Skidelsky was born on 15 April 1939 in Harbin, Manchukuo — now part of present-day Heilongjiang, China. His parents, Boris Skidelsky and Galia Sapelkin, were British subjects of Russian ancestry, Jewish on his father's side and Christian on his mother's. His father worked for the family firm L. S. Skidelsky, which leased the Mulin coalmine, the largest private coalmine in Manchuria, from the Chinese government in 1920. Boris had three brothers, one of whom was the British writer and bridge player S. J. "Skid" Simon (1904–1948). In 1919, a factory was built by L. S. Skidelsky in Harbin for obtaining albumin from blood.

When war broke out between Britain and Japan in December 1941, Skidelsky and his parents were interned first in Manchuria then in Japan, and were finally released in exchange for Japanese internees in England. He went back to China with his parents in 1947, living for a little over a year in Tientsin (now Tianjin). They left for Hong Kong just before the Chinese Communists took Tientsin.

== Education ==
From 1953 to 1958, Skidelsky was a boarder at Brighton College. He went on to read history at Jesus College, Oxford. Between 1961 and 1969 he was successively research student, senior student and research fellow at Nuffield College, Oxford. In 1967 he published his first book, Politicians and the Slump, based on his DPhil dissertation, which explores the ways in which British politicians handled the Great Depression.

== Academic career ==
During a two-year research fellowship at the British Academy Skidelsky published English Progressive Schools (1969) and began work on his biography of Oswald Mosley, which was published in 1975. In 1970, he became an associate professor of history in the School of Advanced International Studies at Johns Hopkins University. However, the controversy surrounding the publication of his biography of Mosley, which some critics felt let Mosley off too lightly, led Johns Hopkins to refuse him tenure. Oxford also proved unwilling to give him a permanent post.

From 1976 to 1978, Skidelsky was Professor of History, Philosophy and European Studies at the Polytechnic of North London. In 1978, he was appointed Professor of International Studies at the University of Warwick, where he remained, although he joined the Economics Department as Professor of Political Economy in 1990. He was a professorial fellow at the Global Policy Institute at London Metropolitan University, and an Honorary Fellow of Jesus College, Oxford. He was elected a Fellow of the British Academy in 1994. From 2016 to 2022 he was a director and trustee of the School of Civic Education. From 2004 to 2017, Skidelsky served as Chairman of Brighton College. He was Emeritus Professor of Political Economy at the University of Warwick.

Skidelsky was a regular monthly columnist for Project Syndicate, an international media organization from 2003 to 2024.

== Political career ==
Skidelsky was a member of three political parties. He left the Labour Party to become a founding member of the Social Democratic Party (SDP), in which he remained until its dissolution in 1990. On 15 July 1991 he was created a life peer as Baron Skidelsky of Tilton in the County of East Sussex. From 1992 to 2001 he took the Conservative Party whip. Around the time of the announcement of his peerage it was speculated that David Owen, a co-founder of the SDP, had advised the then Prime Minister John Major for Skidelsky's appointment. He was made an opposition spokesman in the Lords, first for Culture, then on the Treasury (1997–1999), but he was removed by William Hague, then party leader, for publicly opposing NATO's bombing of Yugoslavia in 1999.

In 2001 Skidelsky left the Conservative Party for the cross benches. He was Chairman of the Social Market Foundation between 1991 and 2001.

In September 2015 Skidelsky endorsed Jeremy Corbyn's campaign in the Labour Party leadership election, writing in The Guardian: "Corbyn should be praised, not castigated, for bringing to public attention these serious issues concerning the role of the state and the best ways to finance its activities. The fact that he is dismissed for doing so illustrates the dangerous complacency of today's political elites. Millions in Europe rightly feel that the current economic order fails to serve their interests. What will they do if their protests are simply ignored?"

On 22 November 2023, following a recommendation put forward two weeks previously, Lord Skidelsky was suspended from the House of Lords for one month after it was found that he had breached the House's Code of Conduct while acting as Chair of the Centre for Global Studies, an economics think tank. In a speech, he commented adversely on the role of the Conduct Committee.

== Business career ==
Non-Executive Director of Stillwell Financial Inc 2001–2003. Non-Executive Director at Janus Capital 2003–2011. Non-Executive Director of the Greater Europe Fund of Wermuth Asset Management 2005–2009. Non-executive Director Sistema 2008–2010. Non-Executive Director of Rusnano Capital between 2010 and 2016, senior advisor from 2015 to 2016. Between 2016 and 2021, Skidelsky was a non-executive director on the board of Russian oil company Russneft. From 2022 to 2025 he was an advisor to Mediobanca, on its Scientific Committee.

== Russia ==
Following Russia's seizure of Crimea, Skidelsky argued that Russia's proposal for a neutral Ukraine and a federal system guaranteeing the minority rights of Russian speakers "should be seriously and urgently tested".

On 28 February 2022, he signed a letter to the Financial Times on the subject of Ukraine, along with David Owen and others, that stated: "NATO governments have rightly said they are willing to address Russia's security concerns, but then say in the same breath that Russia has no legitimate security concerns because NATO is a purely defensive alliance. Whether we like it or not, a NATO that now borders Russia and could in future border even more of Russia is seen by Russia as a security concern."

On 17 April 2022, he argued against Finland's joining NATO and shortly after against the imposition of economic sanctions on Russia following the invasion of Ukraine. In June 2023 Skidelsky attended a reception held by the Russian embassy in London and later explained he wanted to show "respect and affection for the Russian people on their national day, especially in these circumstances".

== Personal life and death ==
Skidelsky married Augusta Hope in 1970. They had two sons and a daughter, Edward Skidelsky, a senior lecturer in philosophy at the University of Exeter, William Skidelsky, a journalist and author of Federer and Me: A Story of Obsession, and Juliet Skidelsky, a school teacher.

Robert Skidelsky died from a brain infection on 15 April 2026 — at the age of 86 in East Sussex, England, United Kingdom.

== Awards ==
External videos
- Booknotes interview with Skidelsky on John Maynard Keynes: Fighting for Freedom, 1937–1946, 28 April 2002., C-SPAN

The second volume of Skidelsky's three-volume biography of John Maynard Keynes, The Economist as Saviour, 1920–1937, won the Wolfson History Prize in 1992. The third volume, Fighting for Britain, 1937–1946, won the Duff Cooper Prize in 2000, the James Tait Black Memorial Prize for biography in 2001, the Arthur Ross Book Award for international relations in 2002 and the Lionel Gelber Prize for International Relations. It was also shortlisted for the Samuel Johnson Prize for non-fiction writing in 2001.

== Selected works ==
- 1967: Politicians and the Slump: The Labour Government of 1929-1931 ISBN 9780333067055
- 1969: English Progressive Schools
- 1975: Oswald Mosley
- 1977: The End of the Keynesian Era (editor) ISBN 9780333212981
- 1981: God’s Fifth Column: A Biography of William Gerhardie (co-editor, with Michael Holroyd)
- 1983: John Maynard Keynes: Hopes Betrayed, 1883–1920 (Vol. 1)
- 1988: Thatcherism (editor) ISBN 9780701133429
- 1992: John Maynard Keynes: The Economist as Saviour, 1920–1937 (Vol. 2)
- 1993: Interests and Obsessions: Historical Essays (Macmillan) ISBN 9780333604571
- 1995: The World After Communism: A Polemic for Our Times (Macmillan) ISBN 9780333622742
  - Published in America as The Road from Serfdom: The Economic and Political Consequences of the End of Communism
- 1996: Keynes (Oxford University Press: Past Masters) ISBN 9780713991222
- 2000: John Maynard Keynes: Fighting for Freedom, 1937–1946 (Vol. 3)
- 2003: John Maynard Keynes: 1883-1946: Economist, Philosopher, Statesman (abridged one-volume edition) ISBN 9780333903124
- 2009: Keynes: The Return of the Master (London: Allen Lane) ISBN 9781586488277
- 2012: How Much Is Enough? Money and the Good Life. with Edward Skidelsky (Allen Lane) ISBN 9781846144486
  - Wie viel ist genug?: Vom Wachstumswahn zu einer Ökonomie des guten Lebens ISBN 9783888978227
- 2014: Britain in the 20th Century: A Success?
- 2015: The Essential Keynes (editor)
- 2017: Austerity vs Stimulus: The Political Future of Economic Recovery (with Nicolò Fraccaroli) Springer link
- 2018: Money and Government: The Past and Future of Economics ISBN 9780300248623
- 2020: What's Wrong with Economics?: A Primer for the Perplexed ISBN 9780300249873
- 2022: Economic Sanctions: A Weapon out of Control?
- 2023: The Machine Age: An Idea, A History, A Warning ISBN 9780241244616
- 2024: Mindless: The Human Condition in the Age of Artificial Intelligence ISBN 9781590517970
- 2026: Keynes for our times. Yale University Press. doi:10.2307/jj.41781109. ISBN 978-0300286830. JSTOR jj.41781109.
