= Stefan Homburg =

German professor of economics (born 1961)

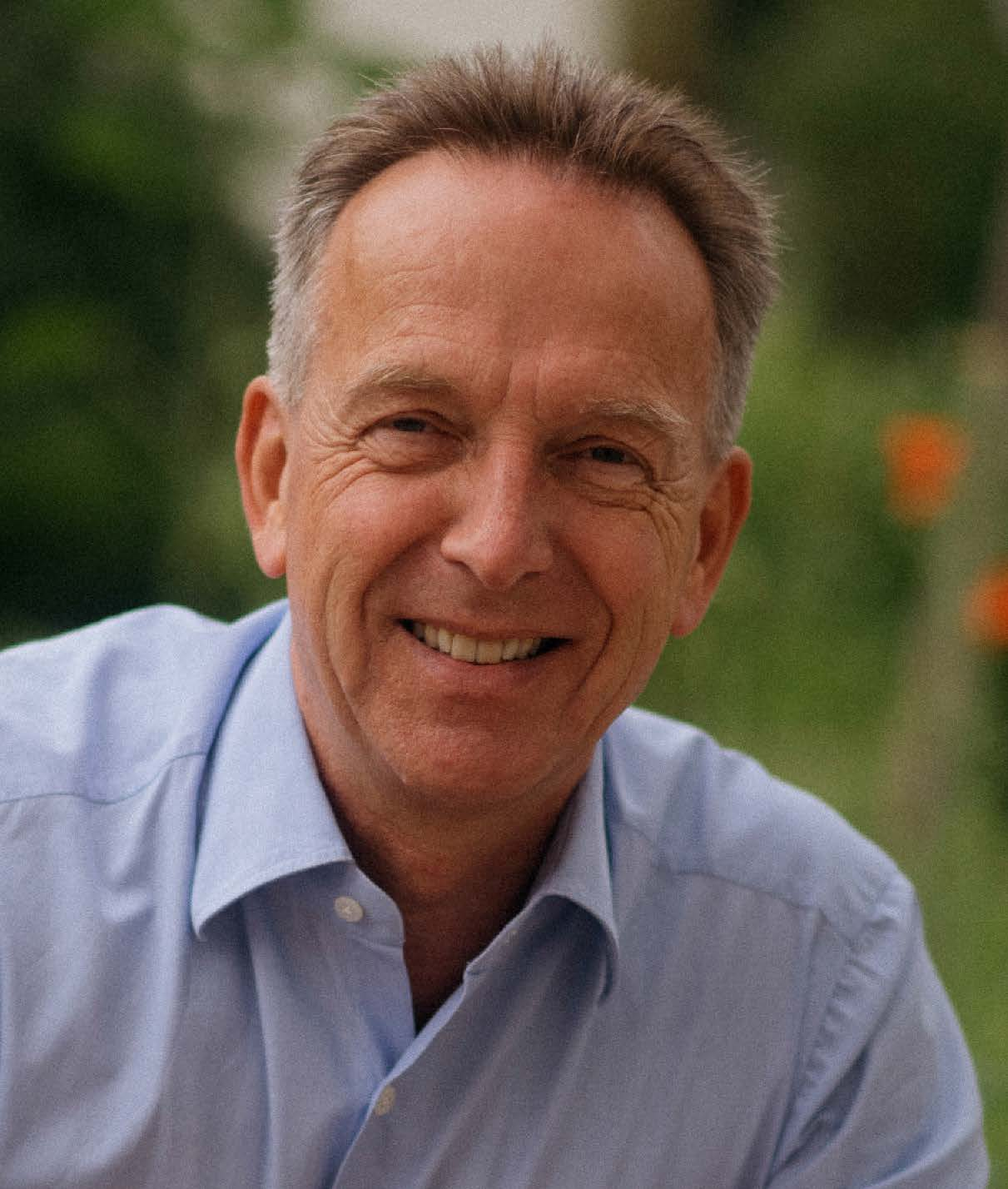
Homburg in 2021

Stefan Homburg (born March 10, 1961) is a retired German professor of economics. He was the director of the Institute of Public Finance at the University of Hannover, Lower Saxony, Germany until his early retirement in 2021. Outside academia he is best known for his controversial statements regarding the COVID-19 pandemic.

Homburg studied economics, philosophy, and mathematics at the Cologne University, where he graduated with a degree in economics in 1985, followed by a doctoral degree in 1987. Subsequently, he was Professor of Economics at University of Bonn and University of Magdeburg, before he moved to Hanover.

Homburg's research focused on macroeconomics and public finance. He has co-authored a textbook in macroeconomics. Other publications address topics in monetary policy, social security, tax law, and business taxation.

Homburg served as a member of several policy committees, including the Advisory Council at the Federal Ministry of Finance, the Federal Constitutional Commission (Bundesstaatskommission), and the Federal Government's Council for Sustainable Developments (RNE). Between 1999 and 2007, he acted as Dean of Hannover's School of Economics and Management. From 1996 until 2003, he was editor of journals of the German Economic Association (Verein für Socialpolitik).

In 2020 Homburg voiced criticism of the German government's response to COVID-19 on Twitter, YouTube, and in opinion pieces for the newspaper Die Welt. In April 2020 he argued against a lockdown in Germany and incorrectly predicted a little more than 3,000 COVID-19 related deaths in Germany. Homburg has claimed without proof that there would be involuntary COVID-19 vaccinations in Germany and stated that the Robert Koch Institute's statistics regarding the COVID-19 epidemic in Germany were "all lies". Several economists, statisticians, and other academics have criticised Homburg's analysis as sloppy and methodologically flawed. Homburg has repeatedly compared the German government's COVID-19 containment measures to fascism and the rise of the Nazis in 1933, which sparked public criticism. The University of Hannover called this comparison "intolerable" and distanced itself from Homburg, leading up to his early retirement in 2021.

In June 2025, Homburg was convicted by a German court for using the slogan of the Nazi paramilitary organization SA, "Alles für Deutschland" ("Everything for Germany"), on a charge of using symbols of unconstitutional organizations under Sections 86a and 86 of the German Criminal Code. The court found that Homburg had deliberately used a symbol of the Nazi era in order to make it socially acceptable. It imposed a fine of 10,400 euros. Homburg has appealed against the judgment.

== Selected publications ==
- A Study in Monetary Macroeconomics, Oxford University Press 2017, ISBN 978-0-19-880753-7.
- Allgemeine Steuerlehre, 7th ed. Vahlen 2015, ISBN 978-3-8006-4922-8.
- Compulsory Savings in the Welfare State. Journal of Public Economics 77, 2000, pp. 233–239.
- Interest and Growth in an Economy with Land. Canadian Journal of Economics 24, 1991, pp. 450–459.
- Coping With Rational Prodigals. Economica 73, 2006, pp. 47–58.
- Explaining the Rise and Decline of the Dollar Kyklos 43, 1990, pp. 53–68 (mit J. Hoffmann).
- Property Taxes and Dynamic Efficiency: A Correction. Economics Letters 123, 2014, pp. 327–328.
- The Efficiency of Unfunded Pension Schemes. Journal of Institutional and Theoretical Economics 146, 1990, pp. 640–647.
- Overaccumulation, Public Debt and the Importance of Land. German Economic Review 15, 2014, pp. 411–435.
- Competition and Co-ordination in International Capital Income Taxation. FinanzArchiv 56, 1999, pp. 1–17.
- What Caused the Great Recession? Review of Economics 66, 2015, pp. 1–12.
