= Territorial evolution of the Caribbean =

Political evolution of Central America and the Caribbean 1700 to present

This is a timeline of the territorial evolution of the Caribbean and nearby areas of North, Central, and South America, listing each change to the internal and external borders of the various countries that make up the region.

The region covered is the Caribbean, its islands (most of which enclose the sea), and the surrounding coasts, as well as the southern part of the Gulf of Mexico, Florida, Central America, and the northern region of South America.

The political evolution of the land surrounding the Caribbean reveals the significant role the region played in the colonial struggles of the European powers since Christopher Columbus arrived in 1492. In the 20th century the Caribbean was again important during World War II, in the decolonization wave in the post-war period, and in the tension between Communist Cuba and the United States (U.S.). Genocide, slavery, immigration and rivalry between world powers have given Caribbean history an impact disproportionate to the size of this small region.

At the time of the European discovery of most of the islands of the Caribbean, three major Amerindian indigenous peoples lived on the islands: the Taíno in the Greater Antilles, The Bahamas and the Leeward Islands; the Island Caribs and Galibi in the Windward Islands; and the Ciboney in western Cuba. The Taínos are subdivided into Classic Taínos, who occupied Hispaniola and Puerto Rico, Western Taínos, who occupied Cuba, Jamaica, and the Bahamian archipelago, and the Eastern Taínos, who occupied the Leeward Islands. Trinidad was inhabited by both Carib speaking and Arawak-speaking groups.

== 17th century ==
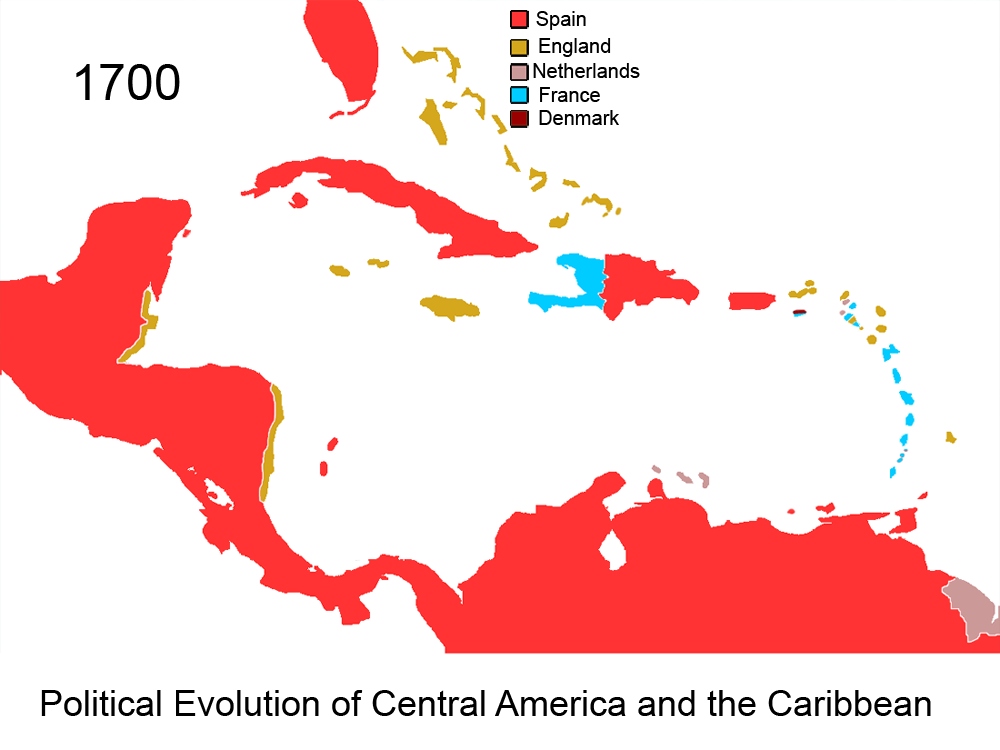

In 1700 Spain controlled most of the mainland portions of North America, Central America, and South America that surround the Caribbean as well as most of the largest islands of the Caribbean. Other players were the:

Kingdom of England

who controlled:

- Mosquito Coast – The Mosquito Coast or eastern portion of what is now [Nicaragua] was declared to be under the protection of the English crown in 1687.
- Anguilla – In 1650, English settlers arrived from Saint Kitts and colonized Anguilla. In 1656 Indians from a neighboring island came and destroyed the settlement. The French temporarily overtook the island in 1666 but under the Treaty of Breda it was returned to English control.
- Antigua and Barbuda – As part of the Treaty of Breda France formally ends its claim of Antigua in 1667 giving control to the British. In 1685 the plantation owner Christopher Codrington, a sugar planter from Barbados leases the island of Barbuda from the British crown.
- Bahamas – In 1670 King Charles II granted the islands to the Earl of Craven a Lord Proprietor of the Carolinas, who rented the islands from the king with rights of trading, tax, appointing governors, and administering the country.
- Barbados – British sailors who landed on Barbados in 1625 arrived at the site of present-day Holetown. From the arrival of the first British settlers in 1627–1628 until independence in 1966, Barbados was under uninterrupted British control.
- British Honduras (Belize)" English buccaneers began cutting logwood (Haematoxylum campechianum), which was used in the production of a textile dye. English buccaneers began using the coastline as a base from which to attack Spanish ships. Buccaneers stopped plundering Spanish logwood ships and started cutting their own wood in the 1650s and 1660s. Logwood extraction then became the main reason for the English settlement for more than a century. A 1667 treaty, in which the European powers agreed to suppress piracy, encouraged the shift from buccaneering to cutting logwood and led to more permanent settlement.
- British Virgin Islands – During the 1698 negotiations between the Netherlands and the British over the ownership of the islands an order from the King become known. The King in 1694 issued an order to prevent foreign settlement in the Virgin Islands. In February 1698 Governor Christopher Codrington was told to regard the earlier 1694 orders as final, and the British entertained no further claims to the islands.
- Cayman Islands - The islands were captured, then ceded to England in 1670 under the Treaty of Madrid.
- Jamaica – Jamaica was captured, then ceded to England in 1670 under the Treaty of Madrid
- Montserrat – Fell under English control in 1632.
- Saint Kitts and Nevis – After the Kalinago Genocide of 1626, Saint Kitts was partitioned between the British and French, with the French gaining the ends, Capisterre in the North and Basseterre in the south, and the British gaining the centre. In 1689, during the War of the Grand Alliance, France re-occupied the entire island, and decimated the British farms. English retaliation by General Codrington defeated the French forces and deported them to Martinique. The Treaty of Rijswijk in 1697 restored pre-war conditions. Nevis was ruled by the British
- Saint Lucia – In 1664, Thomas Warner (son of the governor of St Kitts) claimed Saint Lucia for England. He brought 1,000 men there to defend it from the French, but after two years there were only 89 left, mostly due to disease.
- Turks and Caicos Islands – Bermudians claimed the islands for Britain and came to Turks & Caicos to rake the salt and take it back to Bermuda. Salt was a precious commodity back then as it was used not only for flavoring food but for preserving it as well. They held the islands until 1706

Dutch Republic

The Dutch Republic controlled:

- Aruba – Acquired in 1636 by the Dutch and remained under their control for nearly two centuries.
- Netherlands Antilles – In the 17th century, the islands were conquered by the Dutch West India Company and were used as military outposts and trade bases, most prominent the slave trade.
- Guyana – The Dutch West India Company, which administered most of the colony from 1621 to 1792, granted early Dutch and then British settlers ownership over 100-hectare tracts of land.

Kingdom of France

At the year 1700 Louis XIV ruled as King of France and of Navarre. In the new world he controlled:

- Dominica – The first permanent settlers on the Island were French smallholders from Martinique who arrived in 1715. The island would stay French until the Treaty of Aix-la-Chapelle in 1748 when it was decided between, Great Britain and France to treat the island as neutral ground and leave it to the Caribs.
- Haiti – The first official settlement on Tortuga was established in 1659 under the commission of King Louis XIV. France established the first permanent French settlement on the mainland of Hispaniola, Cap François (later Cap Français, now Cap-Haïtien) in 1670. Under the 1697 Treaty of Ryswick, Spain officially ceded the western third of Hispaniola to France.
- Grenada – On March 17, 1649 a French expedition of 203 men from Martinique, led by Jacques Dyel du Parquet who had been the Governor of Martinique on behalf of the Compagnie des Îles de l'Amérique (Company of the Isles of America) since 1637, landed at St. Georges Harbour and constructed a fortified settlement, which they named Fort Annunciation.
- Guadeloupe – The island was first settled by the French in 1635. Along with the rest of the French Caribbean it became a crown colony of France in 1674.
- Martinique - The island was first settled by France after it was ceded by Spain in 1635 and evolved into a plantation society.
- Saint Barthélemy- From 1651 to 1673 Saint Barthélemy was under the control of the Knights of Malta After 1673 it was returned to France.
- St. Vincent – While the English were the first to lay claim to St. Vincent in 1627, the French would be the first European settlers on the island when they established their first colony at Barrouallie on the Leeward side of St. Vincent shortly before 1700.
- Saint Kitts and Nevis – After the Kalinago Genocide of 1626, Saint Kitts was partitioned between the British and French, with the French gaining the ends, Capisterre in the North and Basseterre in the south, and the British gaining the centre. In 1689, during the War of the Grand Alliance, France re-occupied the entire island, and decimated the British farms. English retaliation by General Codrington defeated the French forces and deported them to Martinique. The Treaty of Ryswick in 1697 restored pre-war coniditons.

Denmark

Denmark controlled what is now the:

- United States Virgin Islands – The Danish West India Company settled on Saint Thomas in 1672, on Saint John in 1694, and purchased Saint Croix from France in 1733.

== 18th century ==
1702

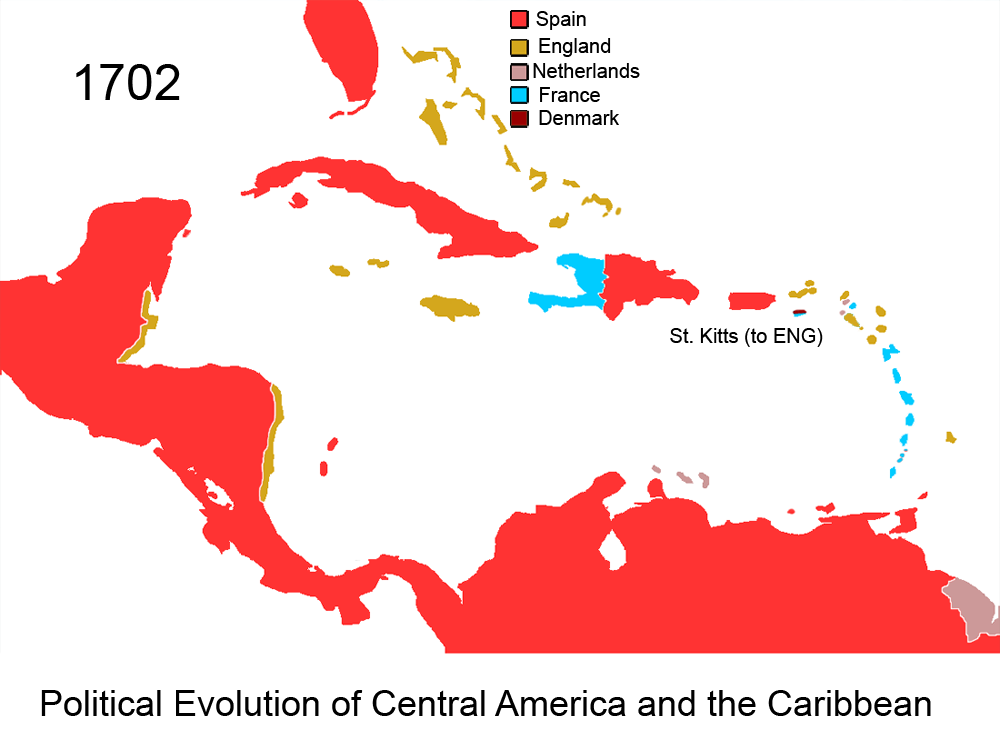

English forces annex the whole of the island of St. Kitts.

1706

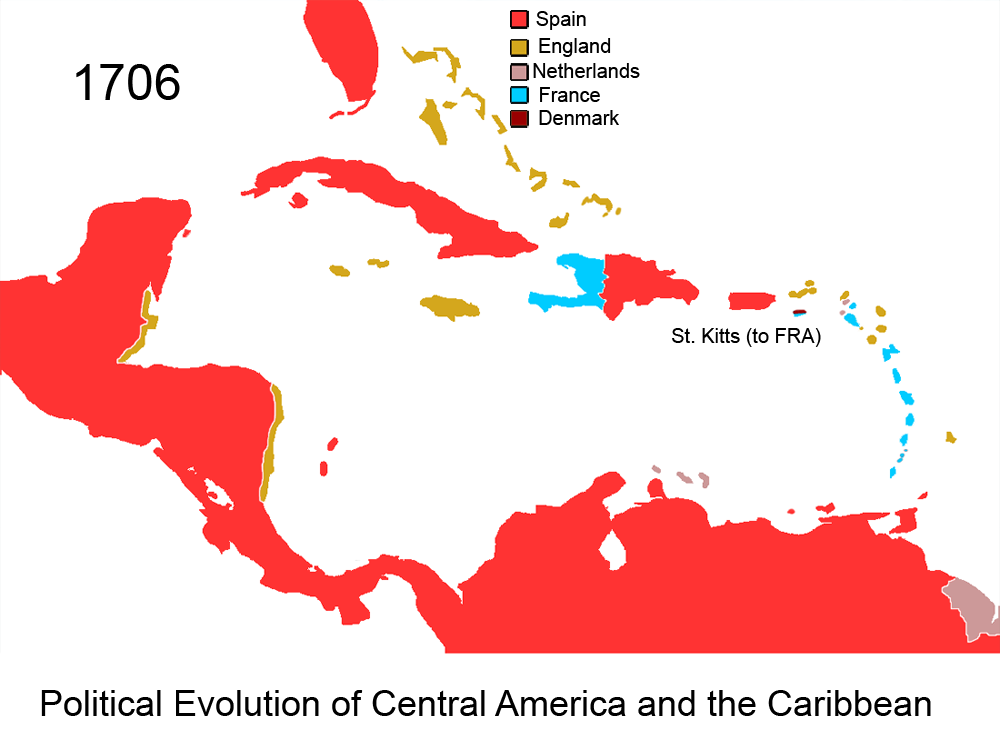

On St. Kitts the French made one more major attack on British troops in 1706 during the War of the Spanish Succession taking the whole of the island.

1706

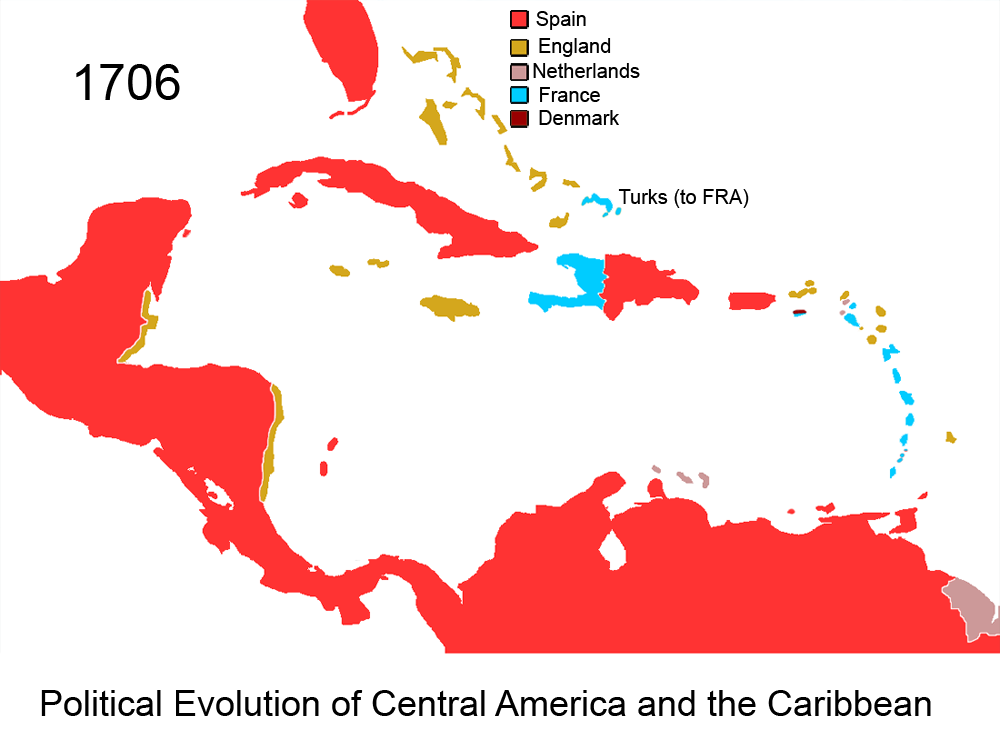

Spanish and French forces seized the Turks in 1706.

1710

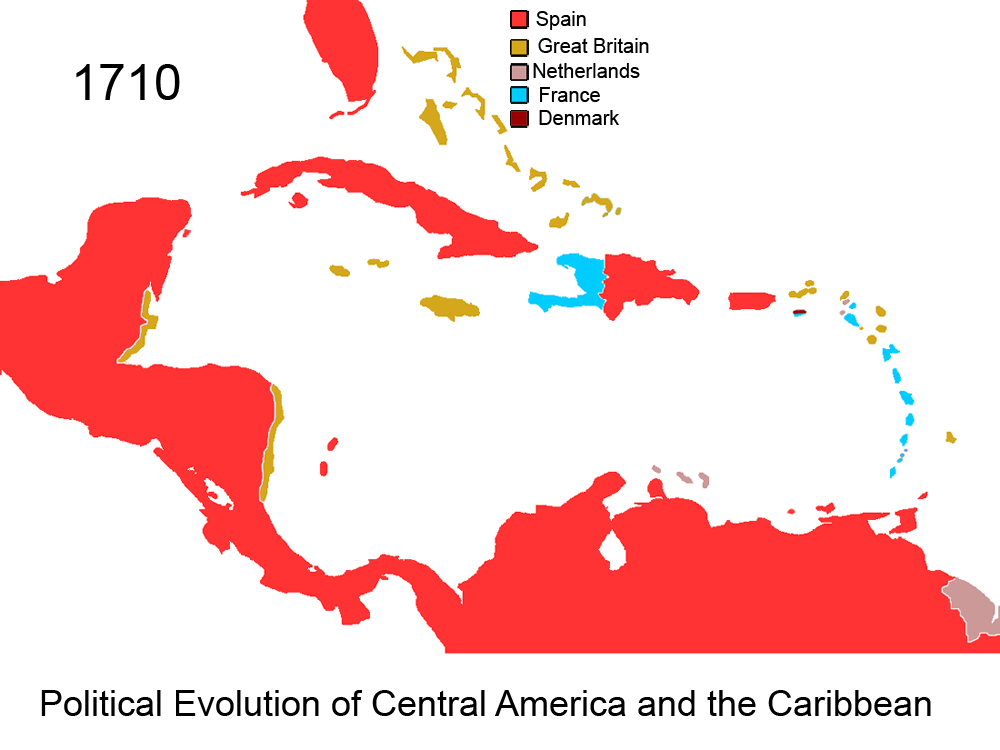

English Bermudian forces expel the French and Spanish forces from Turks in what was Bermuda's only independent military operation.

1713

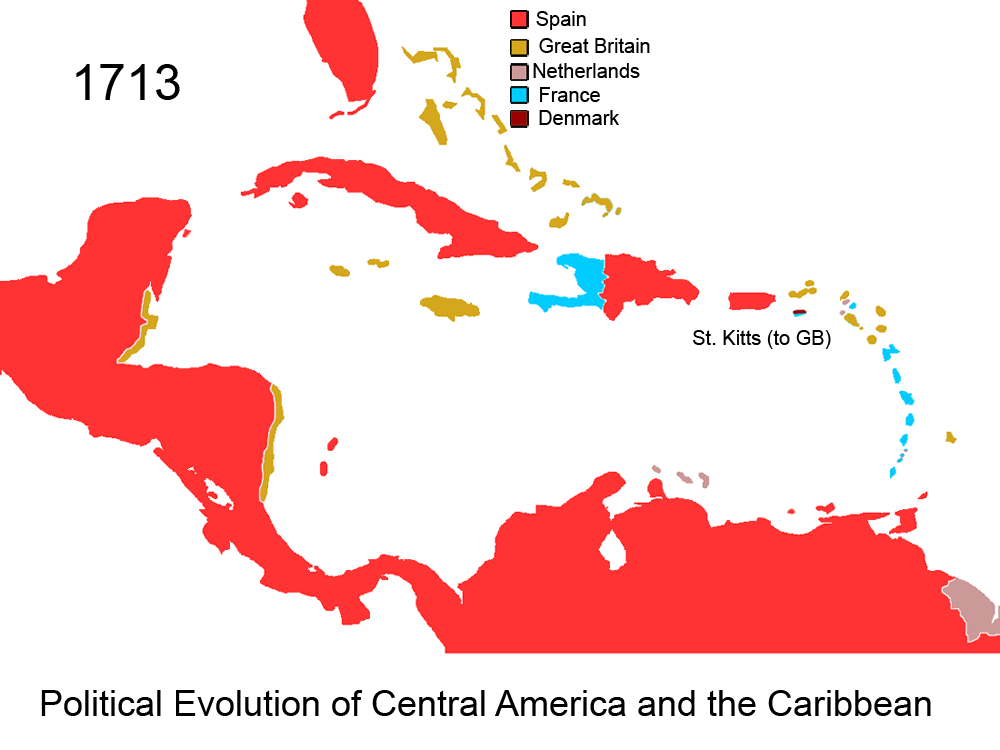

The French held St. Kitts for 8 years (1713) until the Treaty of Utrecht was signed. The treaty ceded the entire island of St. Kitts to the British.

1723

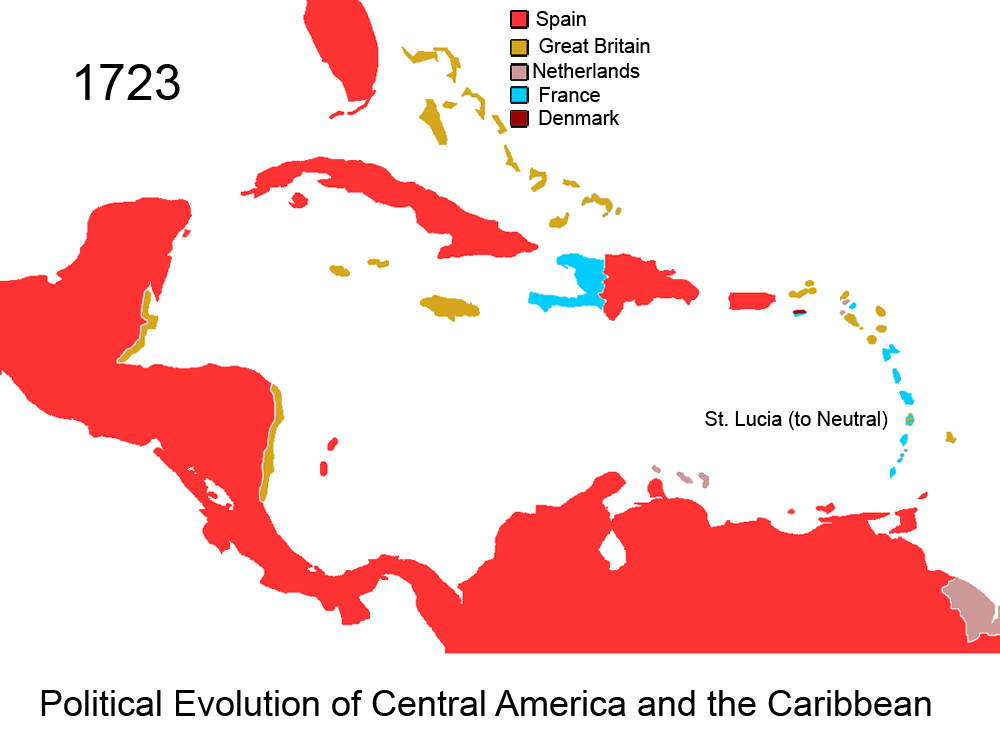

Saint Lucia becomes Neutral territory (agreed by Britain and France in the Treaty of Choc Island)

1733

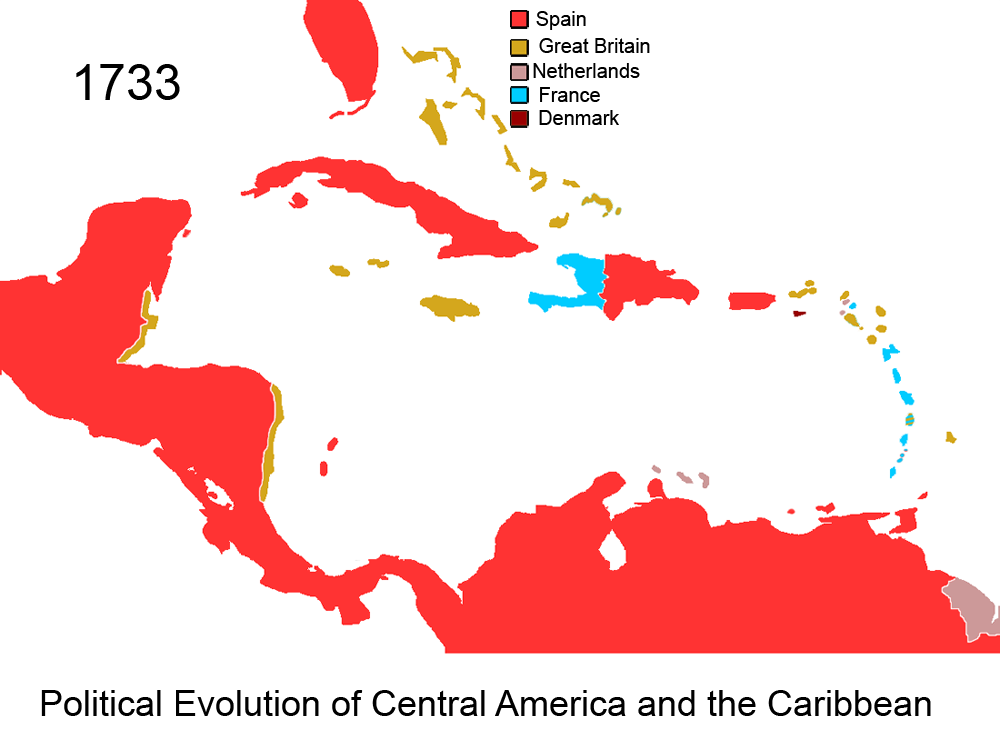

Denmark purchases the island of Saint Croix from France in 1733 it is in what now is the United States Virgin Islands

1744

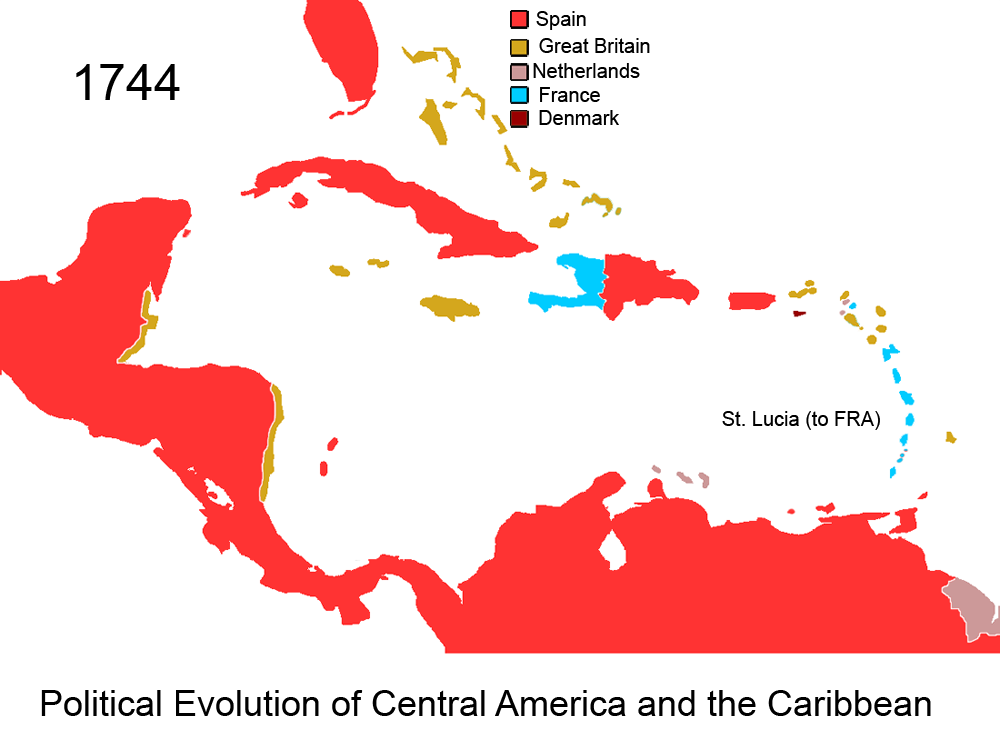

Saint Lucia becomes the French colony of (Sainte Lucie).

1748

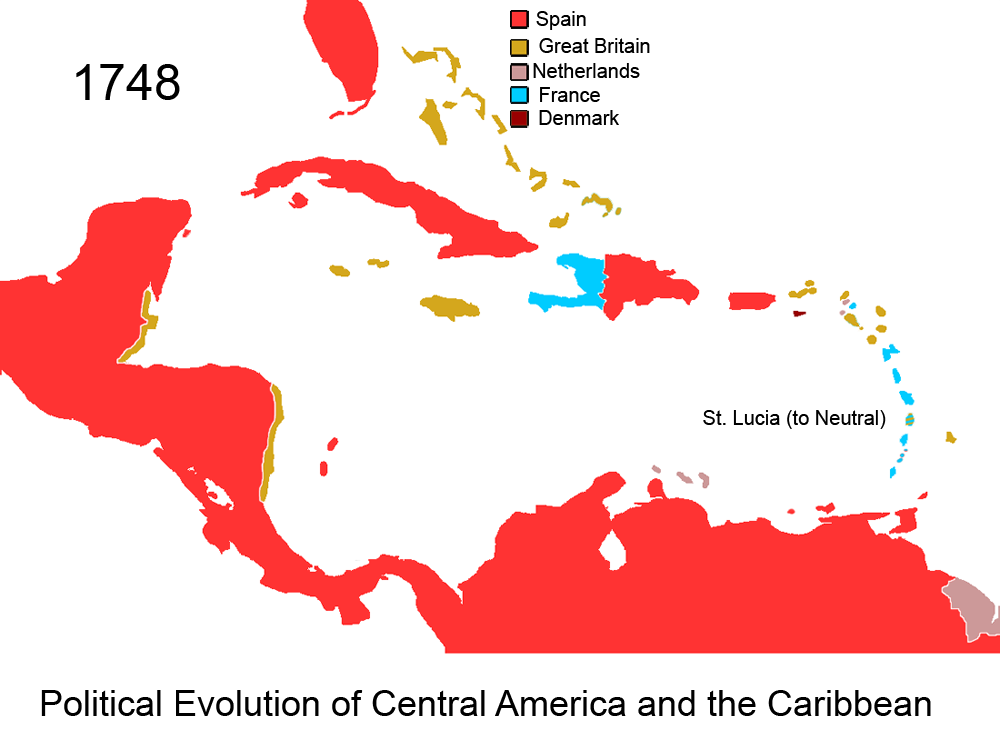

Saint Lucia becomes Neutral territory (de jure agreed by Britain and France)

1756

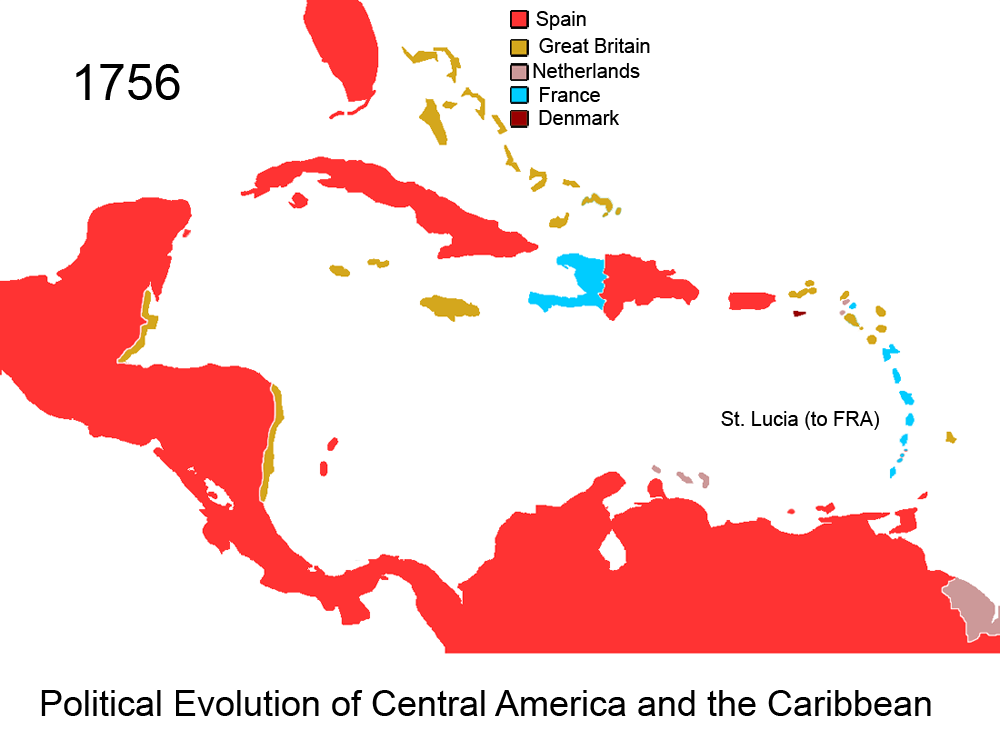

Saint Lucia once again becomes a French colony (Sainte Lucie)

1759

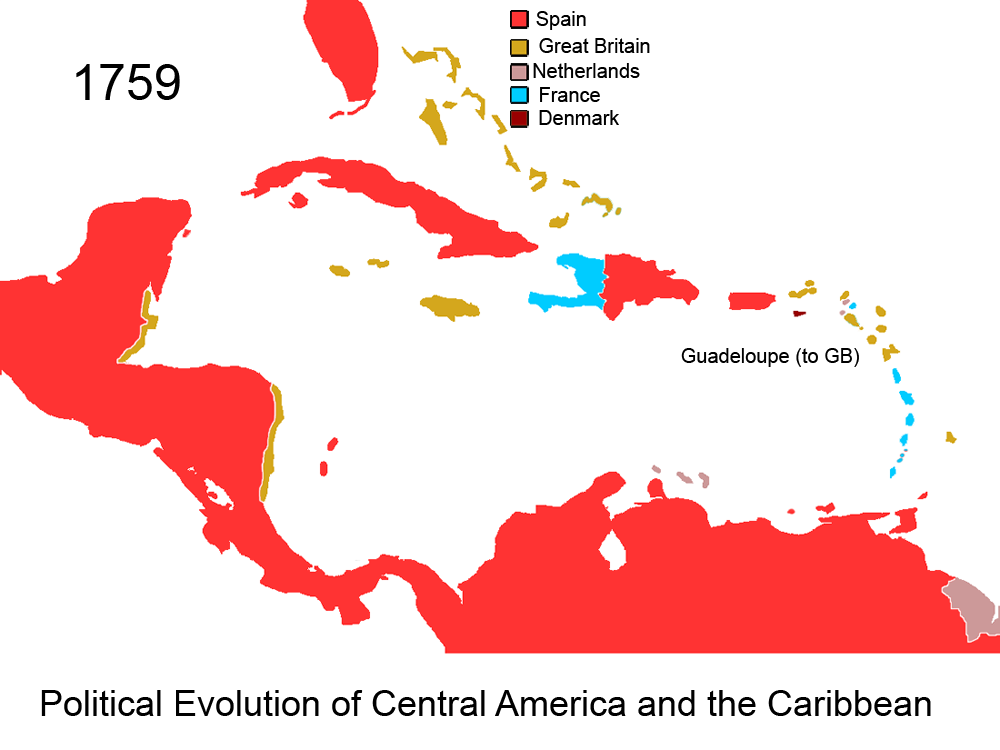

In Guadeloupe from 1759 through 1763, as a part of the Seven Years' War, the British took control of the island and the main city Pointe-à-Pitre was established during these years.

1761

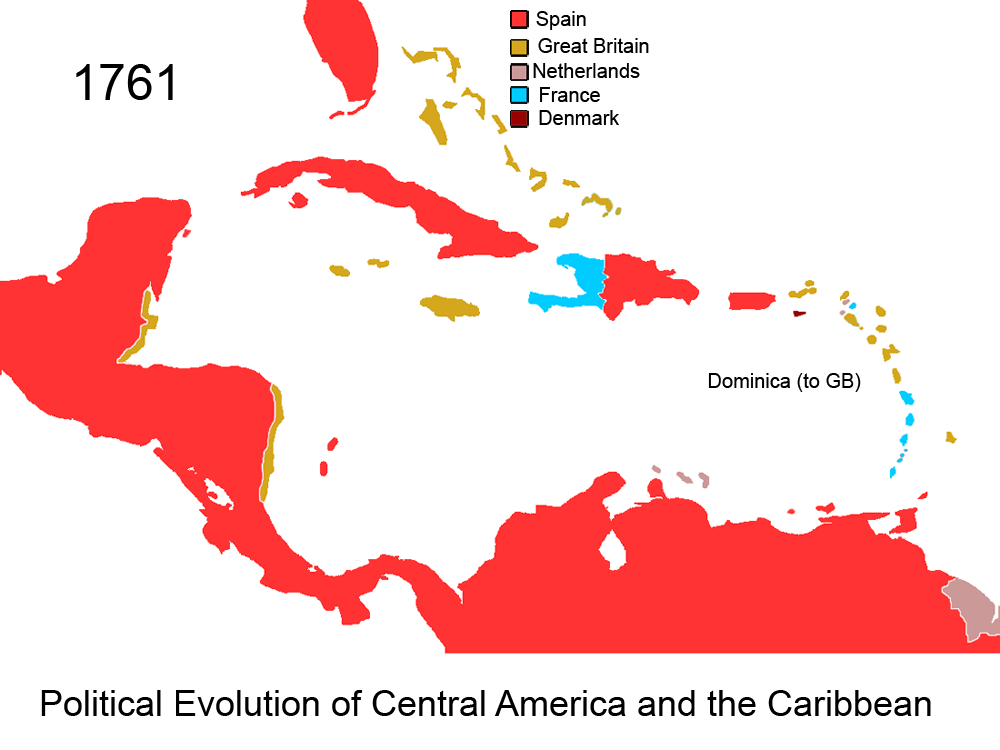

On June 7, 1761 a British expedition against Dominica led by Lord Rollo was successful and the island was conquered.

1762

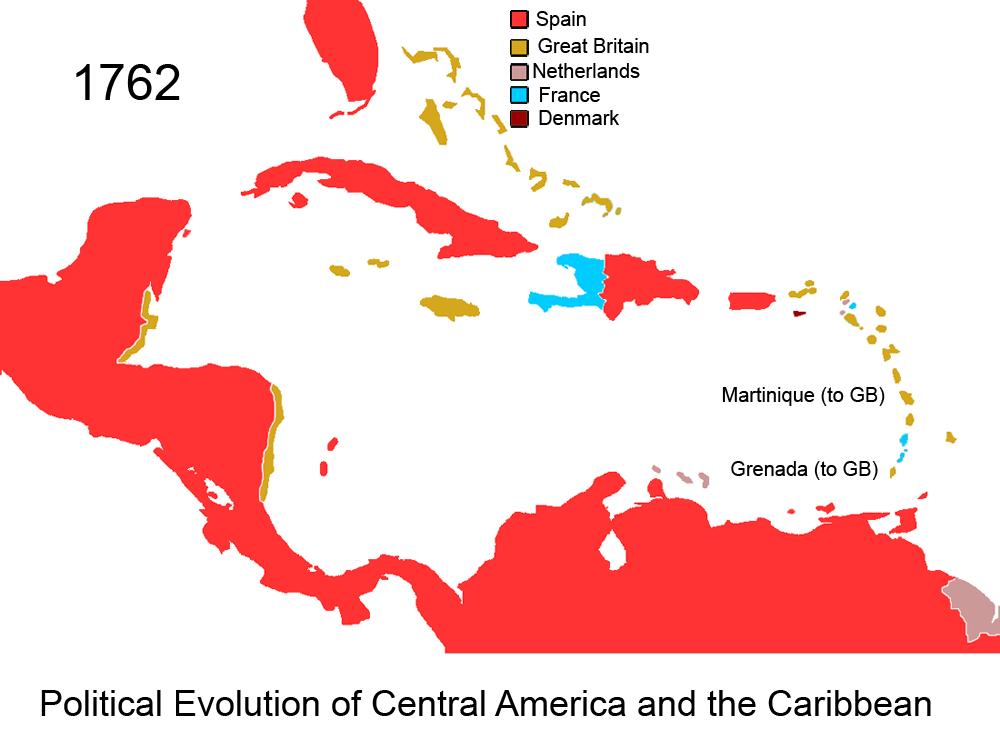

Britain captured Martinique and Grenada during the Seven Years' War, holding it from 1762 to 1763. Saint Lucia becomes British.

1763

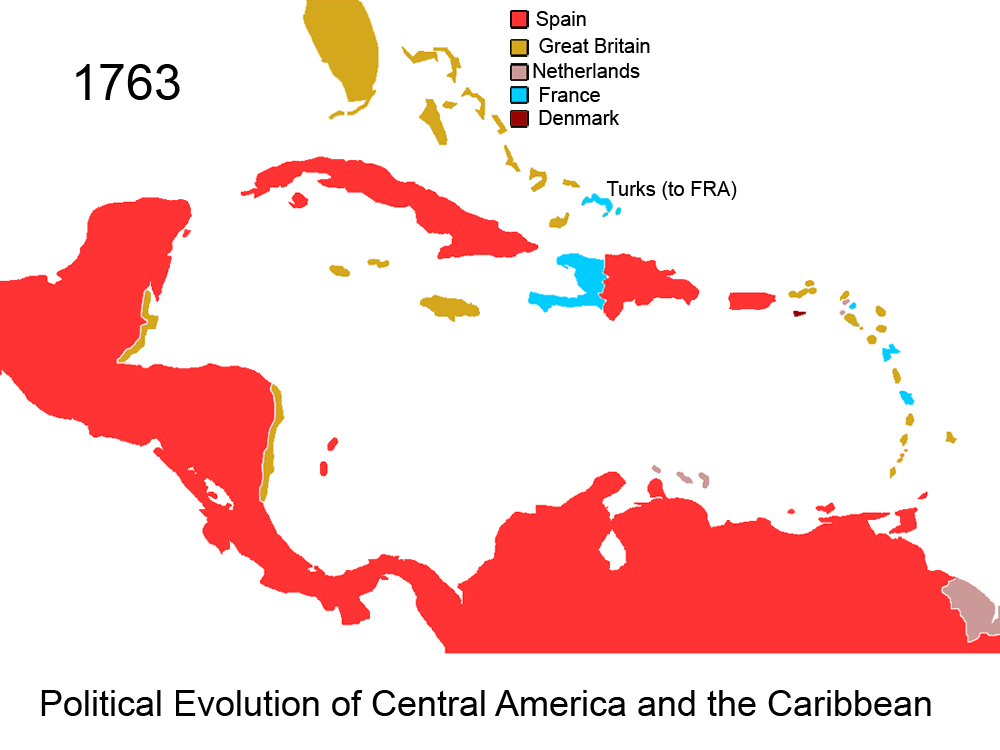

The Treaty of Paris, often called the Peace of Paris, or the Treaty of 1763, was signed on February 10, 1763, by the kingdoms of Great Britain, France and Spain, with Portugal in agreement. It ended the Seven Years' War. In the treaty:

- France formally ceded possession of Dominica, St. Vincent, and Grenada to the Kingdom of Great Britain.
- France in exchange for the entirety of Canada regained Martinique as well as the neighboring island of Guadeloupe
- Spain gives Florida to Great Britain.
- Turks and Caicos Islands remained under French occupation.

1779

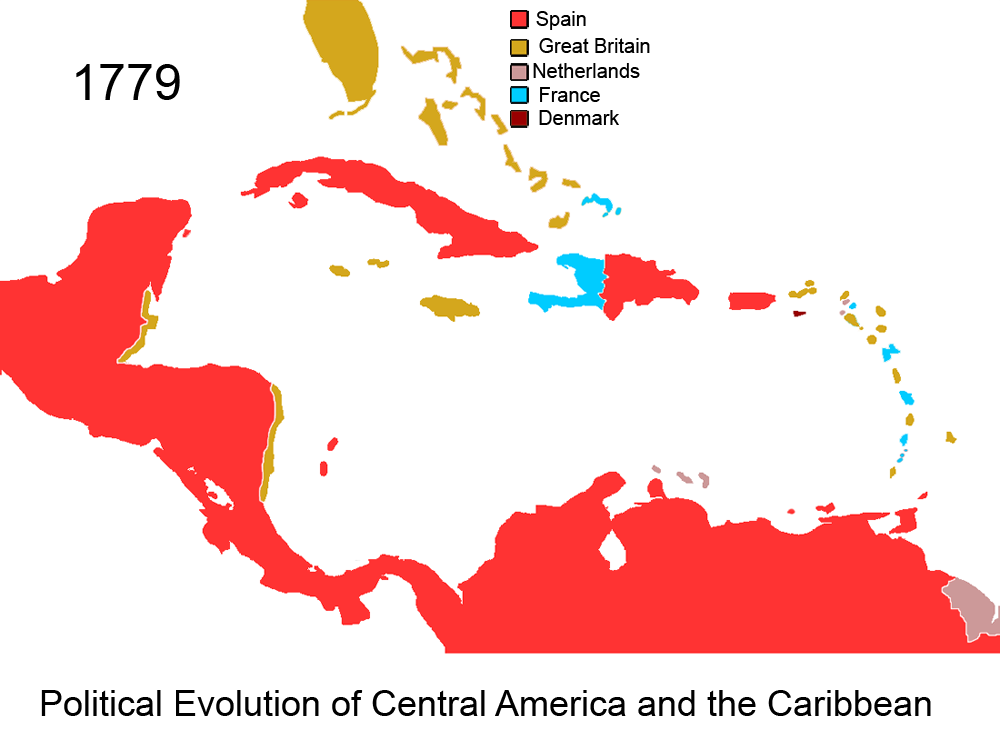

Saint Vincent restored to French rule in 1779.

1782

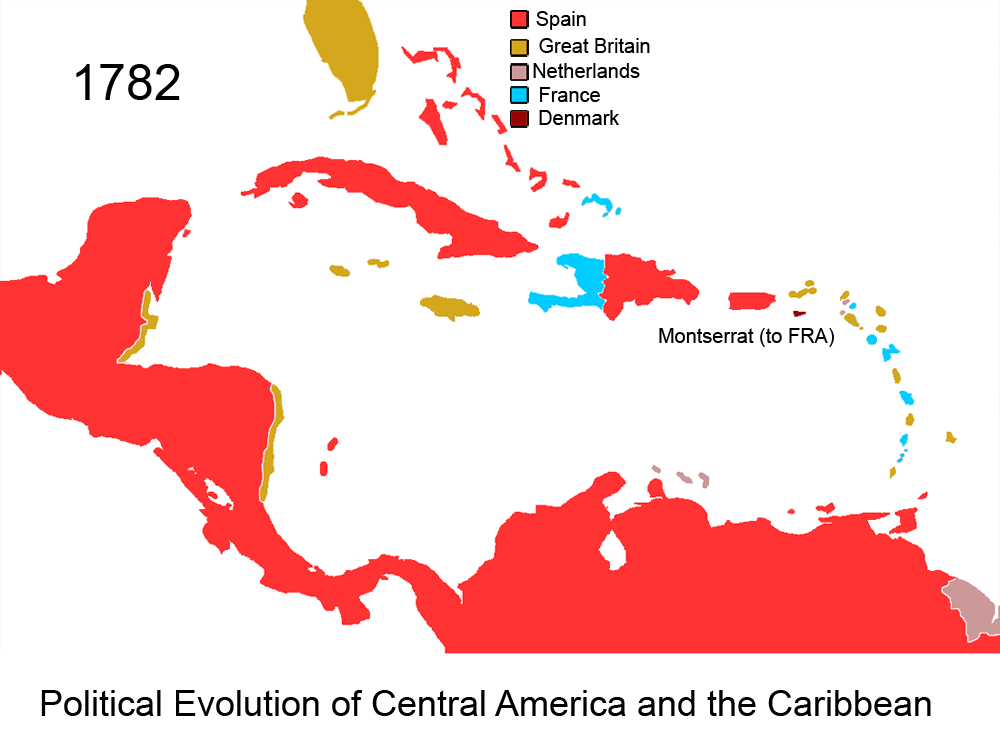

- On May 8, 1782, General Gálvez and his Spanish forces captured the British naval base at New Providence in the Bahamas during the American War of Independence.
- In 1782, during the American Revolutionary War, Montserrat was captured by France.

1783

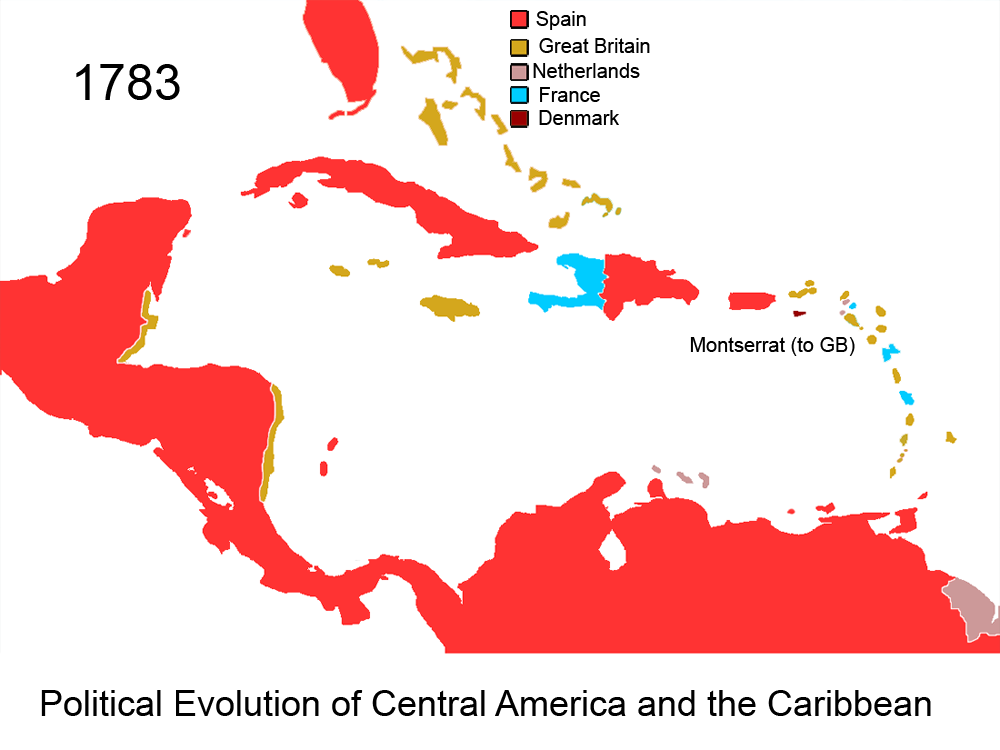

The Treaty of Paris, signed on September 3, 1783, ratified by the Congress of the Confederation on January 14, 1784 and by the King of Great Britain on April 9, 1784 (the ratification documents were exchanged in Paris on May 12, 1784), formally ended the American Revolutionary War between the Kingdom of Great Britain and the United States of America, which had rebelled against British rule starting in 1775. The other combatant nations, France, Spain and the Dutch Republic had separate agreements; for details of these see Peace of Paris (1783).

In the agreements:

- The Floridas were returned to Spanish control
- St. Vincent, Montserrat, Turks and Caicos Islands, Bahamas was returned to Great Britain

1784

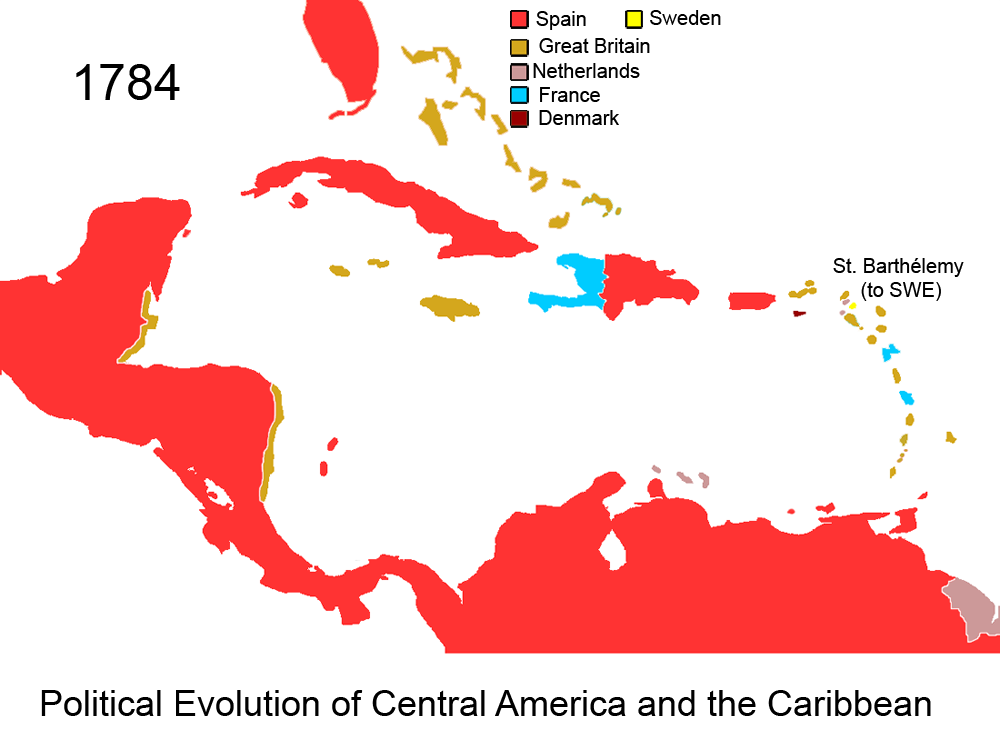

Saint Barthélemy was sold to Sweden on July 1, 1784.

1794

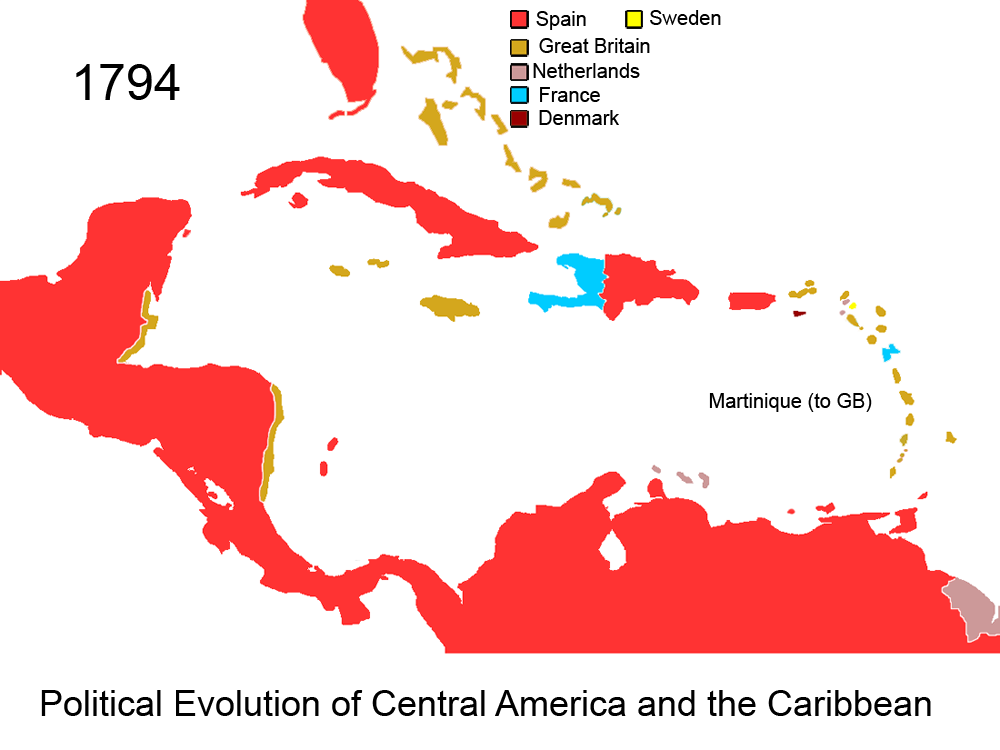

After the emancipation decrees of Léger-Félicité Sonthonax and Étienne Polverel during the Haitian Revolution, the French National Convention declared the end of slavery in all French territories in February 1794, and named Victor Hugues civil commissioner to Guadeloupe. French plantation owners and other Royalists had called in the United Kingdom as a way of rejecting the freedom of slaves on the French colonies:

- In Martinique the French planter Jean Baptiste Dubuc, signed the Whitehall accord of submission to England thus enabling the British military conquest of Martinique starting from February 6, 1794 and completed by March 1794.
- British forces took control of the island on April 21, 1794. Victor Hugues by rallying slaves and gens de couleur, Hugues was able to retake the island by December 1794, when he obliged the English general to surrender.

1795

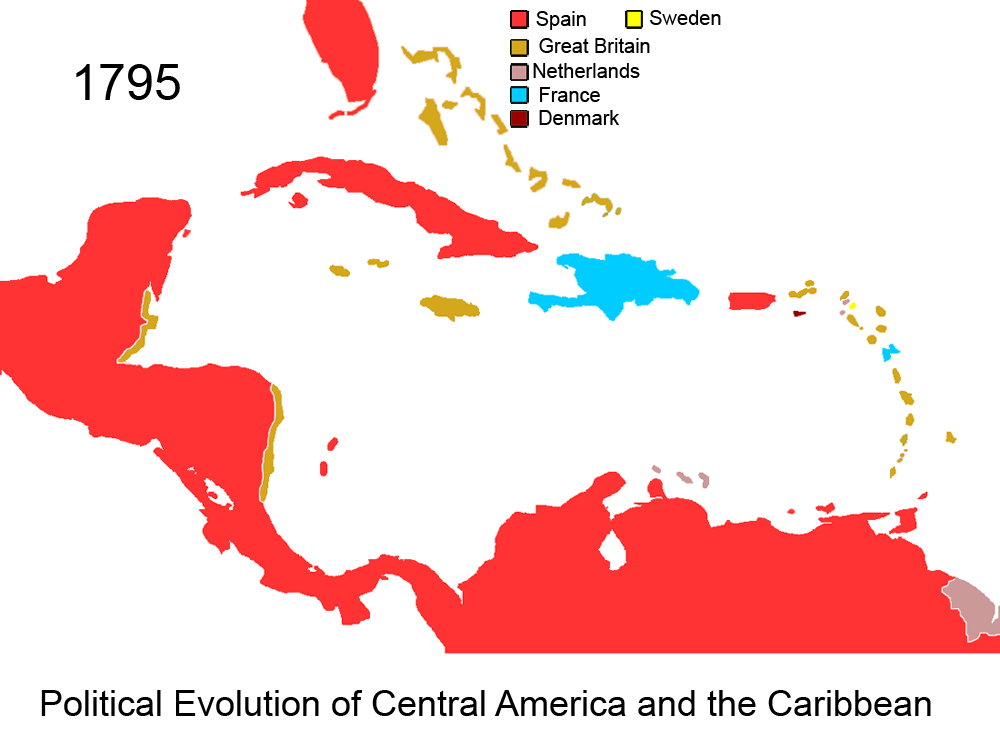

France came to own the whole island of Hispaniola in 1795, when in the Treaty of Basel Spain ceded Santo Domingo as a consequence of the Spain fighting against France in the French Revolutionary Wars.

1796

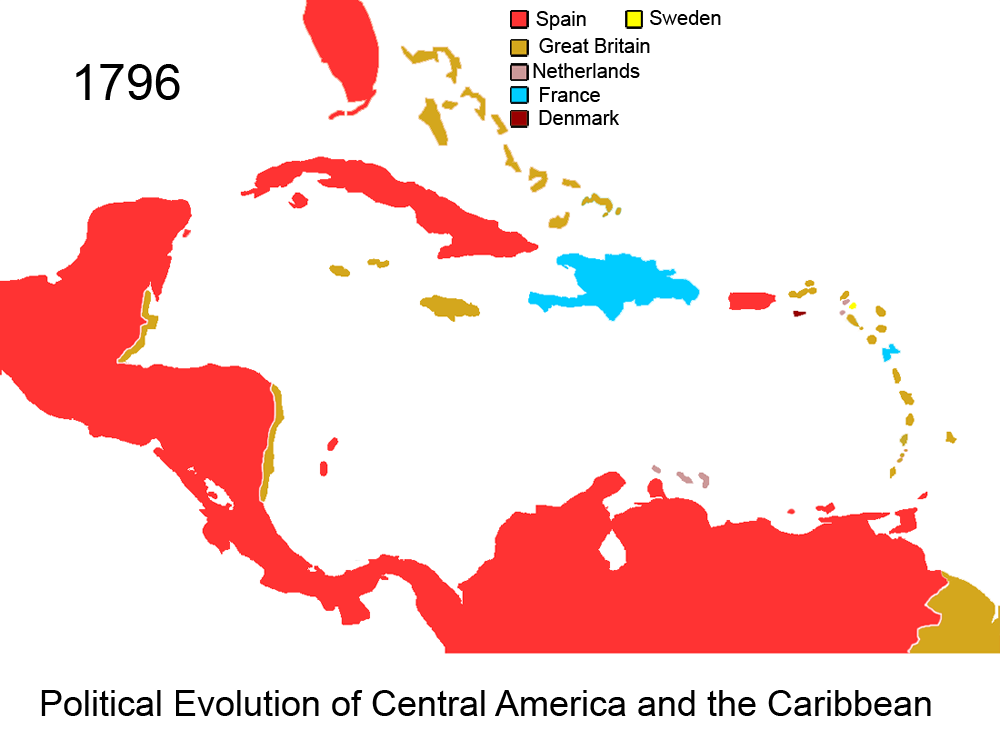

Effective British control of Guyana began in 1796 during the French Revolutionary Wars, at which time the Netherlands were under French occupation and Great Britain and France were at war. A British expeditionary force was dispatched from its colony of Barbados to seize the colonies from the French-dominated Batavian Republic. The colonies surrendered without a struggle, and initially very little changed, as the British agreed to allow the long-established laws of the colonies to remain in force.

1799

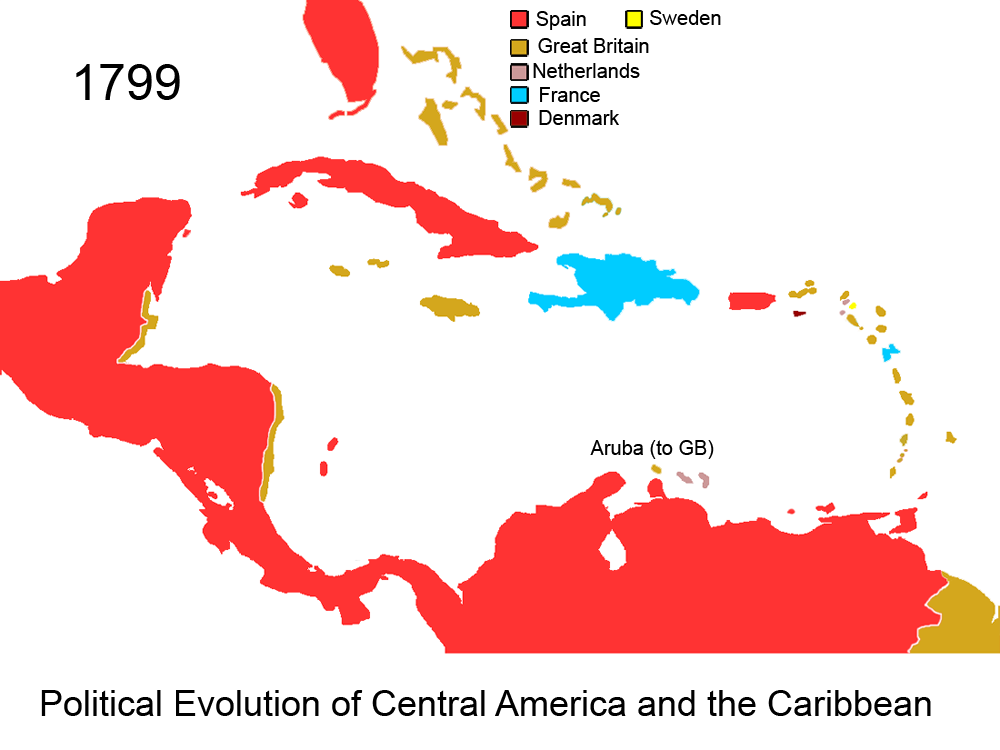

Britain occupied Aruba from 1799 to 1802.

== 19th century ==
1802

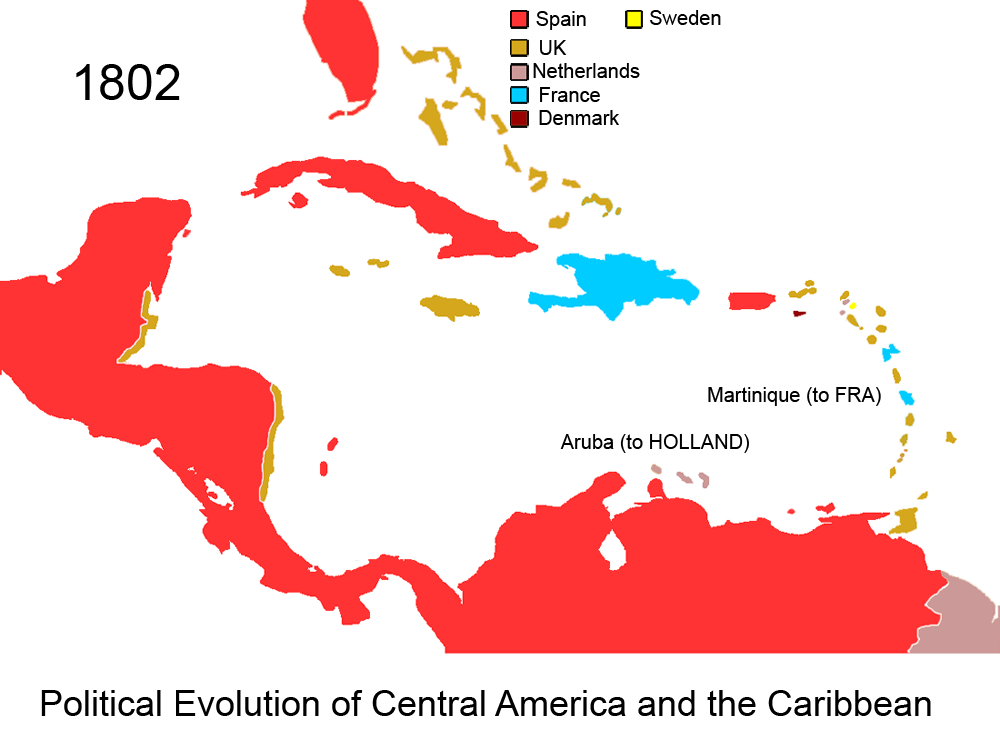

The Treaty of Amiens is signed which ends the hostilities between France and the United Kingdom during the French Revolutionary Wars. It was signed on 25 March 1802 (Germinal 4, year X in the French Revolutionary Calendar) by Joseph Bonaparte and the Marquess Cornwallis as a "Definitive Treaty of Peace". As part of the treaty:

- Dutch retake Aruba and Guyana in 1802.
- British returned the island of Martinique to the French.
- In 1797, General Sir Ralph Abercromby and his squadron sailed through the Bocas and anchored off the coast of Chaguaramas. The Spanish Governor Chacon decided to capitulate without fighting. Trinidad became a British crown colony, with a French-speaking population and Spanish laws. The 1797 conquest and formal ceding of Trinidad in 1802 led to an influx of settlers from England or the British colonies of the Eastern Caribbean.

1803

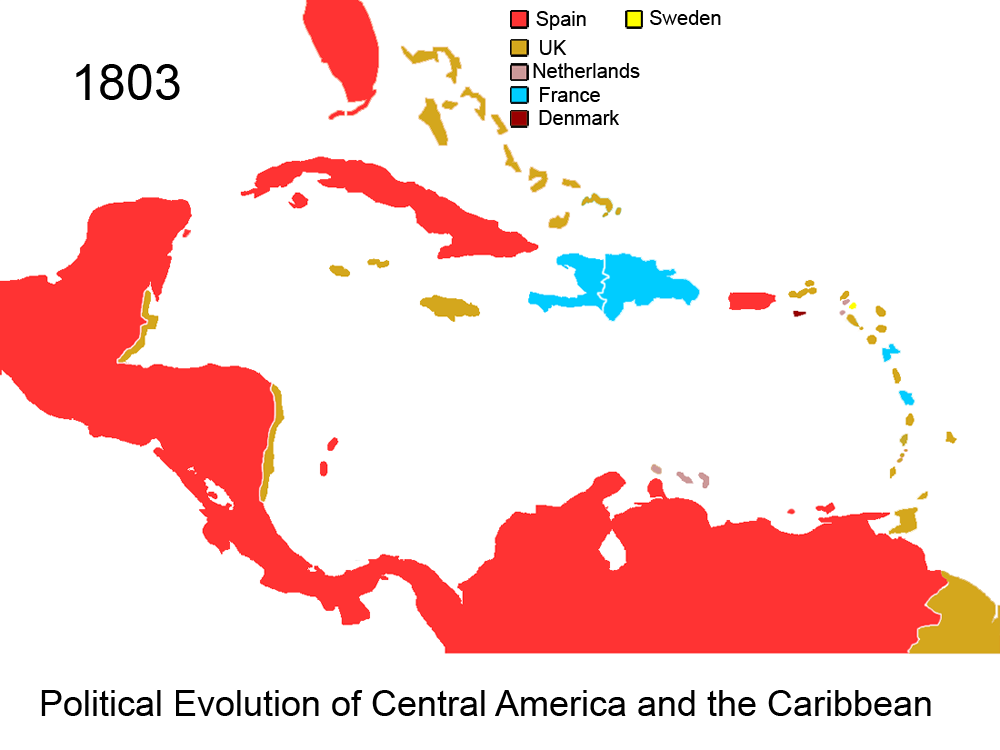

Guyana is retaken by the British.

1804

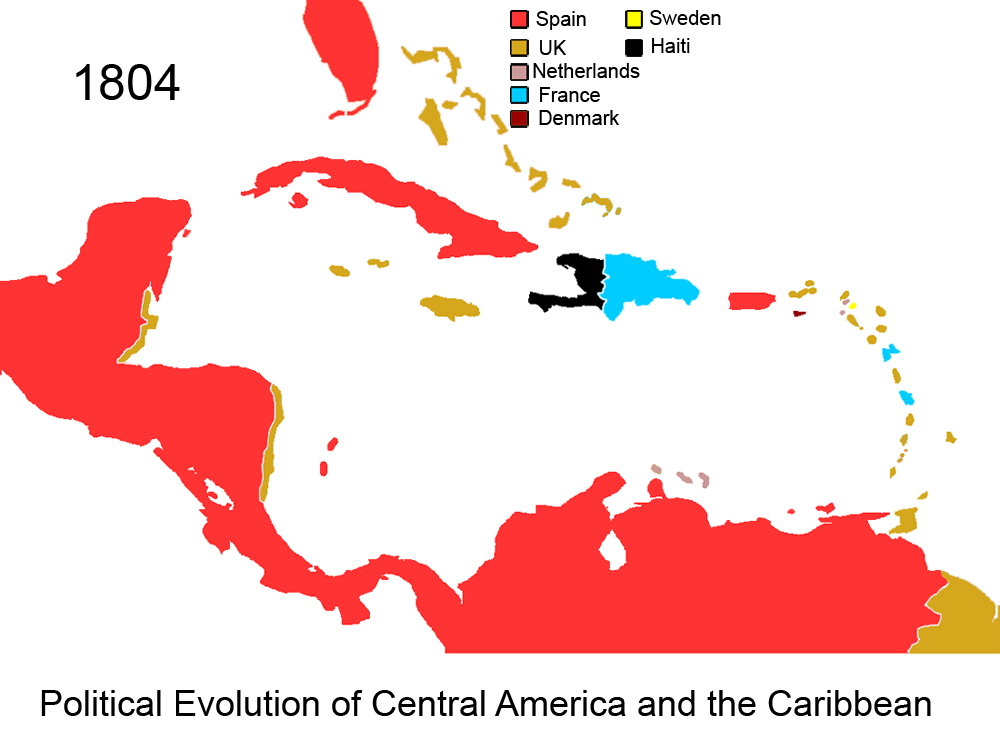

In Haiti The native leader Jean-Jacques Dessalines, long an ally of Toussaint Louverture, defeated the French troops led by Donatien-Marie-Joseph de Vimeur, vicomte de Rochambeau at the Battle of Vertières. At the end of the double battle for emancipation and independence, former slaves proclaimed the independence of Saint-Domingue on 1 January 1804, declaring the new nation as Haiti, honoring one of the indigenous Taíno names for the island. Haiti was consequently the first country in the Western Hemisphere to abolish slavery. Dessalines was proclaimed Emperor for life by his troops.

1805

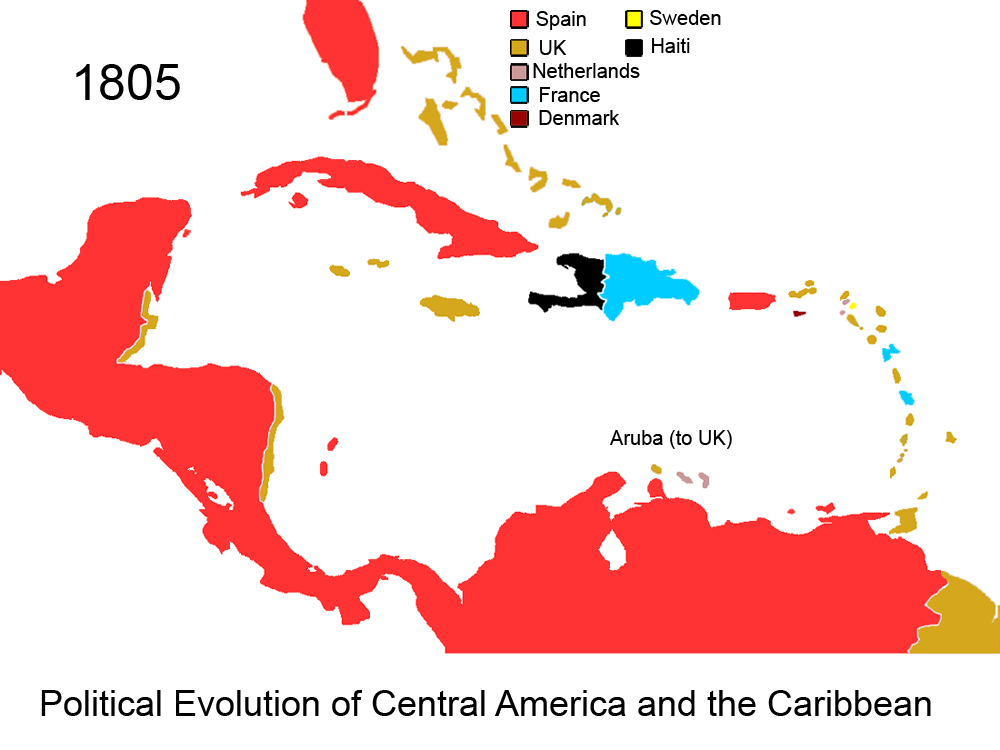

Britain occupied Aruba from 1805.

1808

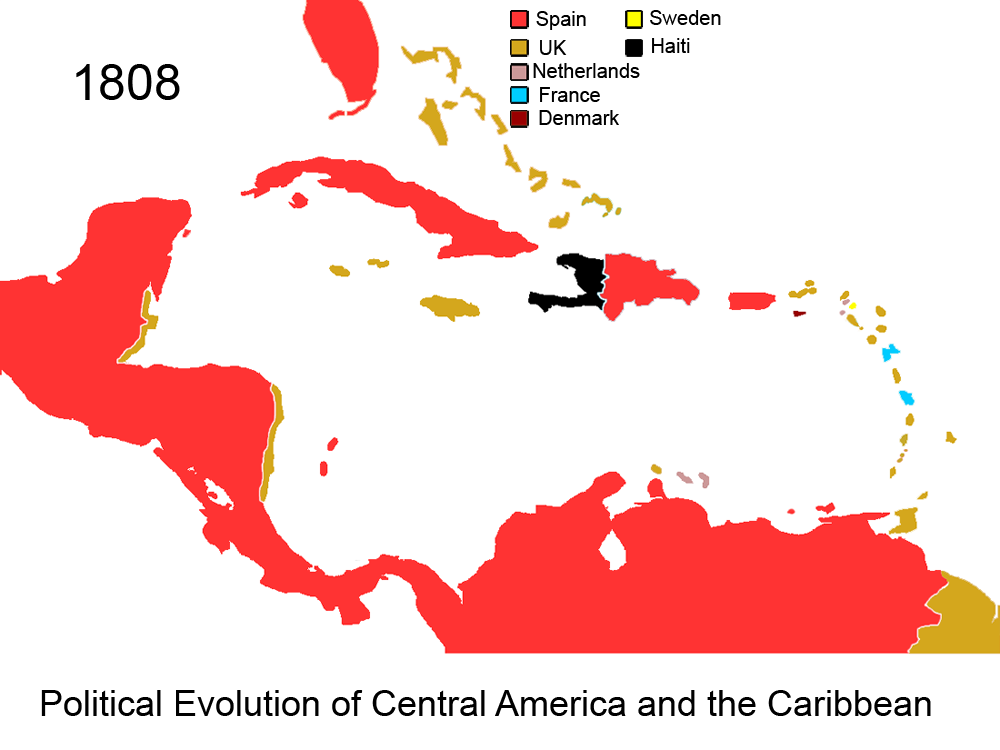

In 1808, following Napoleon's invasion of Spain, the criollos of Santo Domingo revolted against French rule and, with the aid of Great Britain (Spain's ally) and Haiti, returned Santo Domingo to Spanish control.

1809

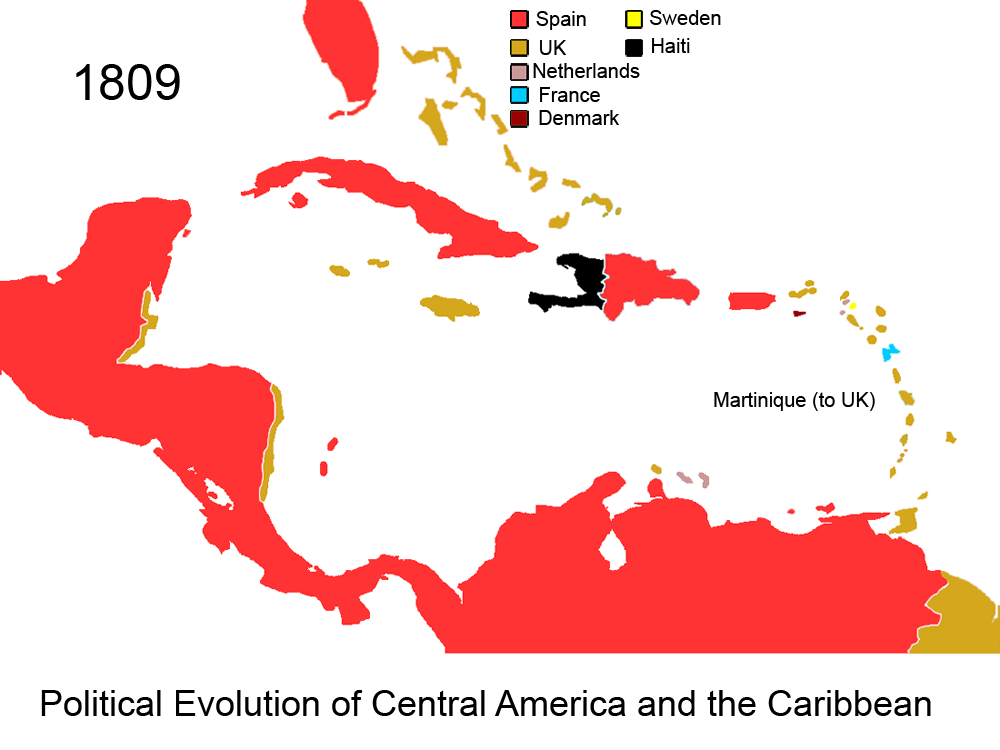

In Martinique the surrender of Fort Desaix to British forces solidified their occupation of the island of Martinique. The remaining shipping and military supplies were seized and the regular soldiers of the garrison taken as prisoners of war. The militia were disbanded and Martinique became a British colony, remaining under British command until the restoration of the French monarchy in 1814, when it was returned to French control.

1810

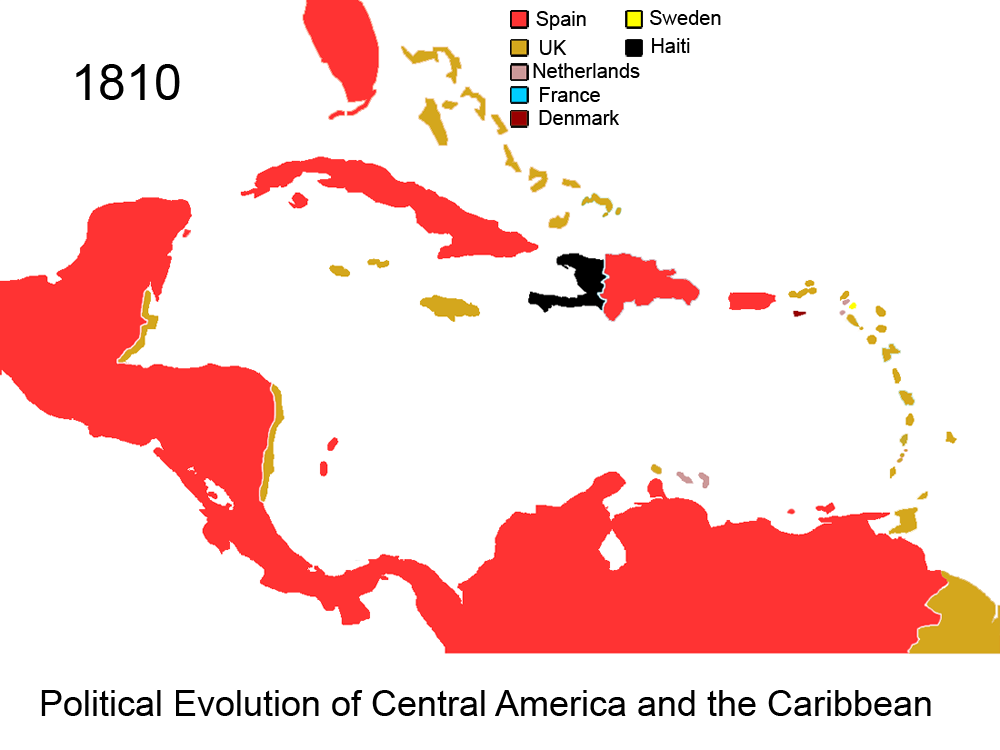

On February 4, 1810 the British once again seized Guadeloupe.

On July 5, 1811 Venezuela declared independence from Spain.

On November 11, 1811 the province of Cartagena declared independence from Spain. The United Provinces of New Granada was established a few days later on November 27, with Cartagena joining it.

1814

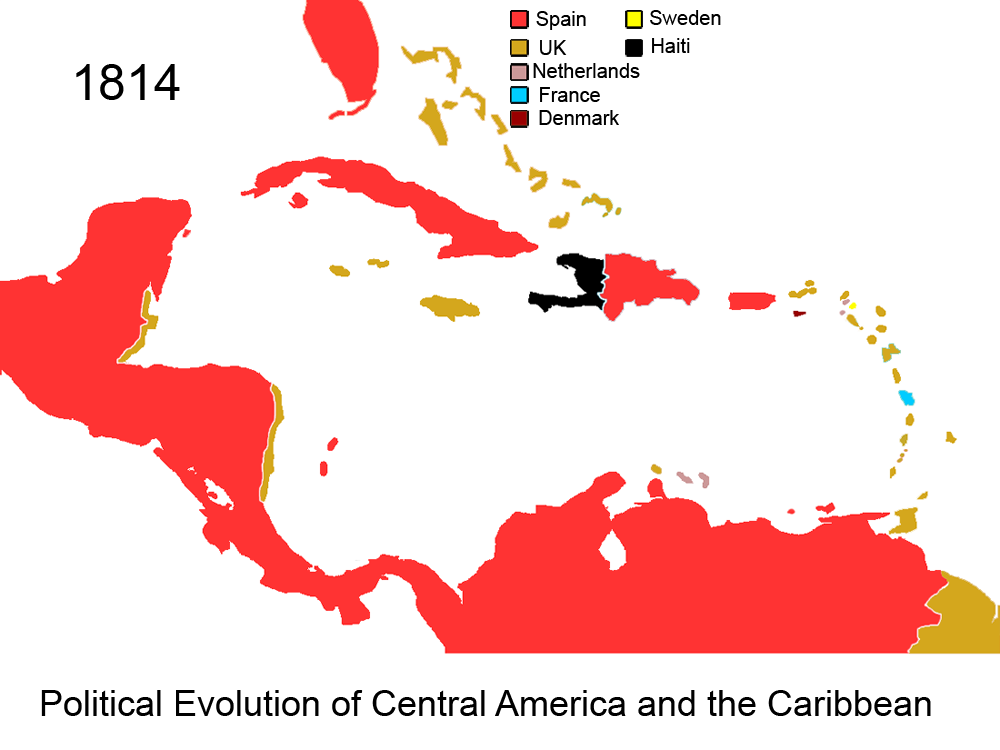

The Treaty of Paris of May 30, 1814, ceded Tobago and, Martinique once more to France.

- The colonies of Essequibo, Demerara, and Berbice were officially ceded to the United Kingdom in the Anglo-Dutch Treaty of 1814 and at the Congress of Vienna in 1815. In 1831 they were consolidated as British Guiana.
- In Saint Lucia the UK eventually triumphed, with France permanently ceding Saint Lucia in 1814 in the Treaty of Paris, 30 May 1814.

1816

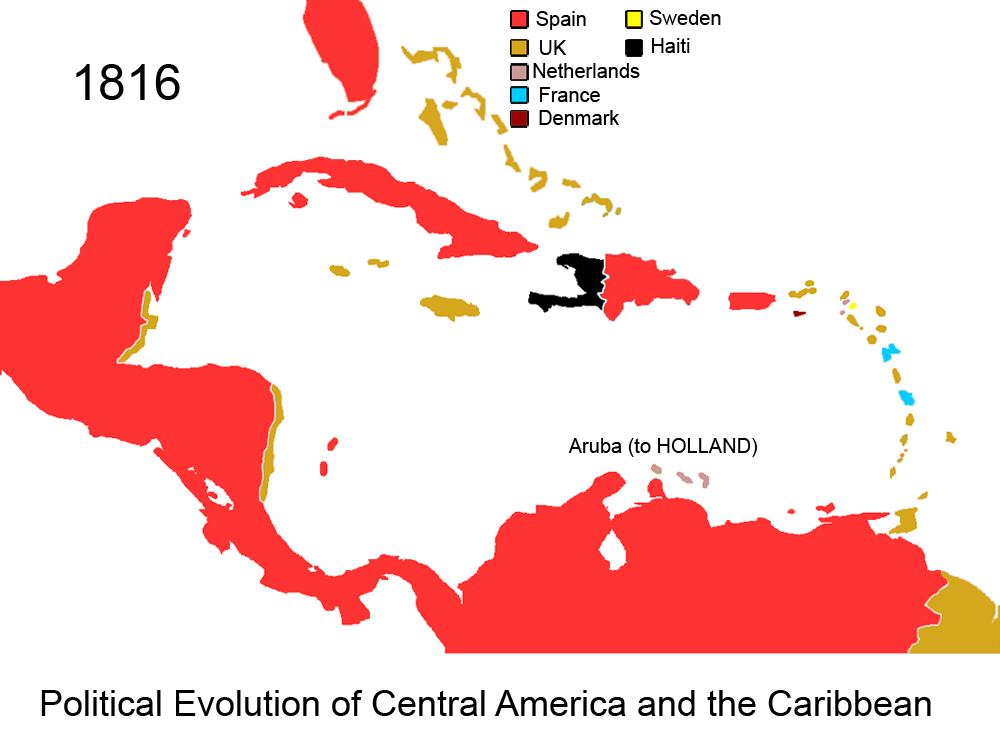

- Dutch retake Aruba.
- British occupied Guadeloupe in 1810; however, after some changes in status, it was restored to France in 1816.
- The Spanish retake control of New Granada (Colombia).

1819

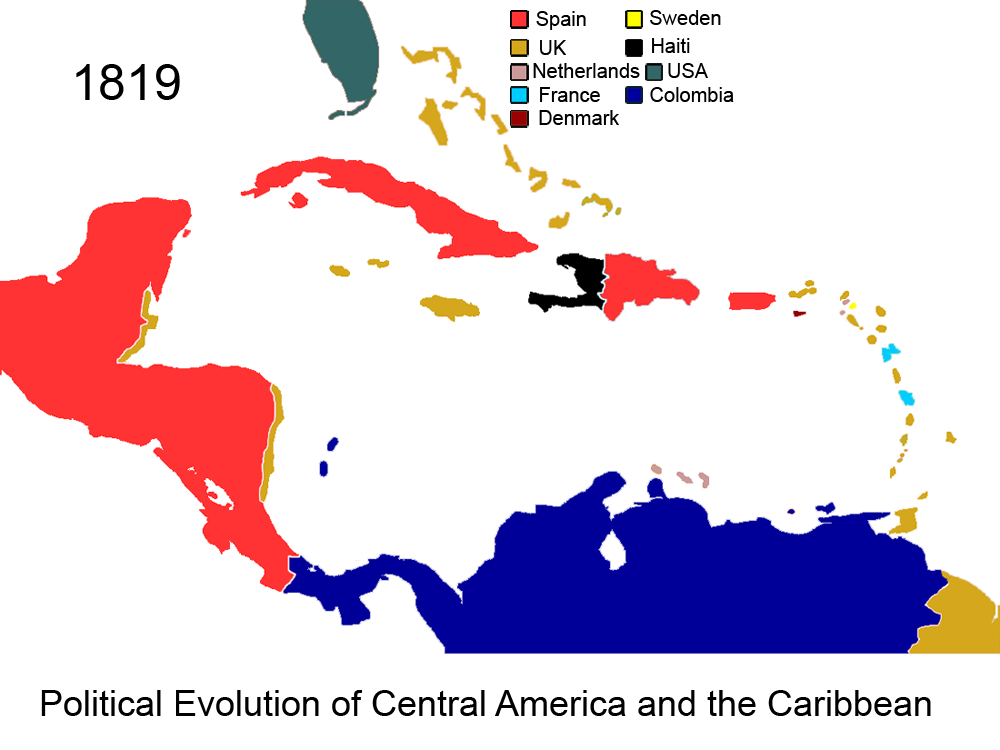

The Colombian rebellion finally succeeded in 1819 when the territory of the Viceroyalty of New Granada and the Captaincy General of Venezuela became the Republic of Gran Colombia organized as a federation of Ecuador, today's Colombia and Venezuela (Panama was part of Colombia). The official name of the country at the time was the Republic of Colombia. Historians adopted the term "Gran Colombia" to distinguish this republic from the present-day Republic of Colombia, which began using the same name in 1863.

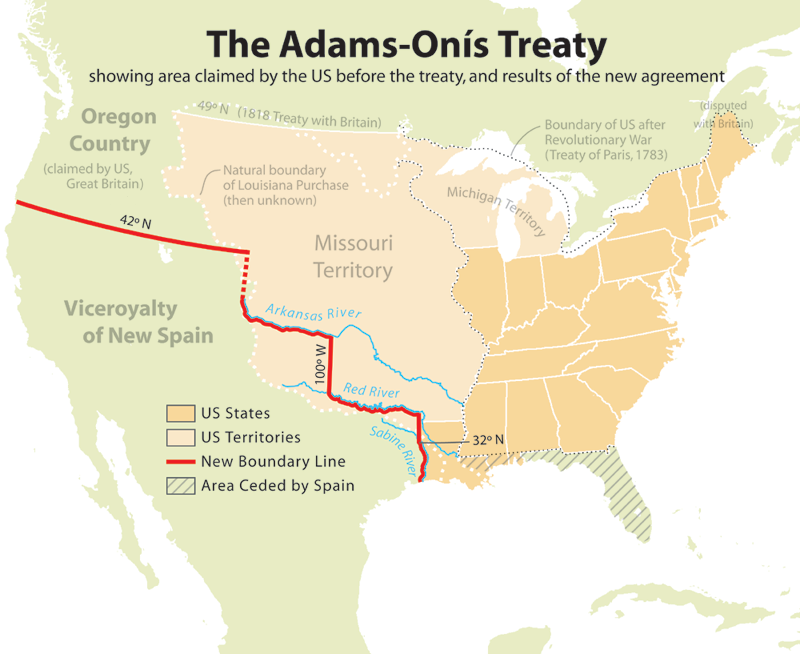
Map showing results of the Adams-Onís Treaty.

- The Adams–Onís Treaty of 1819, also known as the Transcontinental Treaty of 1819, settled a border dispute in North America between the United States and Spain. The treaty was the result of increasing tensions between the U.S. and Spain regarding territorial rights at a time of weakened Spanish power in the New World. In addition to ceding Florida to the United States, the treaty settled a boundary dispute along the Sabine River in Texas and firmly established the boundary of U.S. territory and claims through the Rocky Mountains and west to the Pacific Ocean in exchange for the U.S. paying residents' claims against the Spanish government up to a total of $5,000,000 and relinquishing its own claims on parts of Texas west of the Sabine River and other Spanish areas under the terms of the Louisiana Purchase.

1821

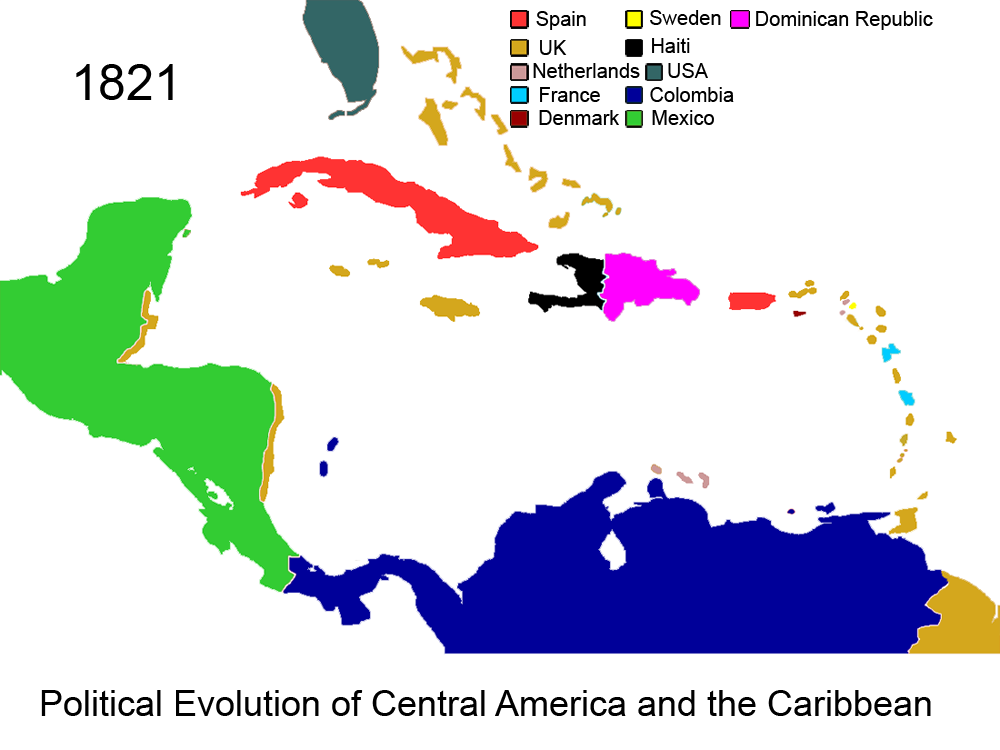

- On November 9, 1821 the Spanish colony of Santo Domingo was toppled by a group led by Spanish General José Núñez de Cáceres. Forces which opposed unification with Haiti formally declared independence from Spain on November 30, 1821. The new nation was known as República del Haití Español (Republic of Spanish Haiti).
- The Mexican War of Independence lasted eleven years until the troops of the liberating army entered Mexico City in 1821. Thus, although independence from Spain was first proclaimed in 1810, it was not achieved until 1821, by the Treaty of Córdoba, which was signed on August 24 in Córdoba, Veracruz, by the Spanish viceroy Juan O'Donojú and Agustín de Iturbide, ratifying the Plan of Iguala.

1822

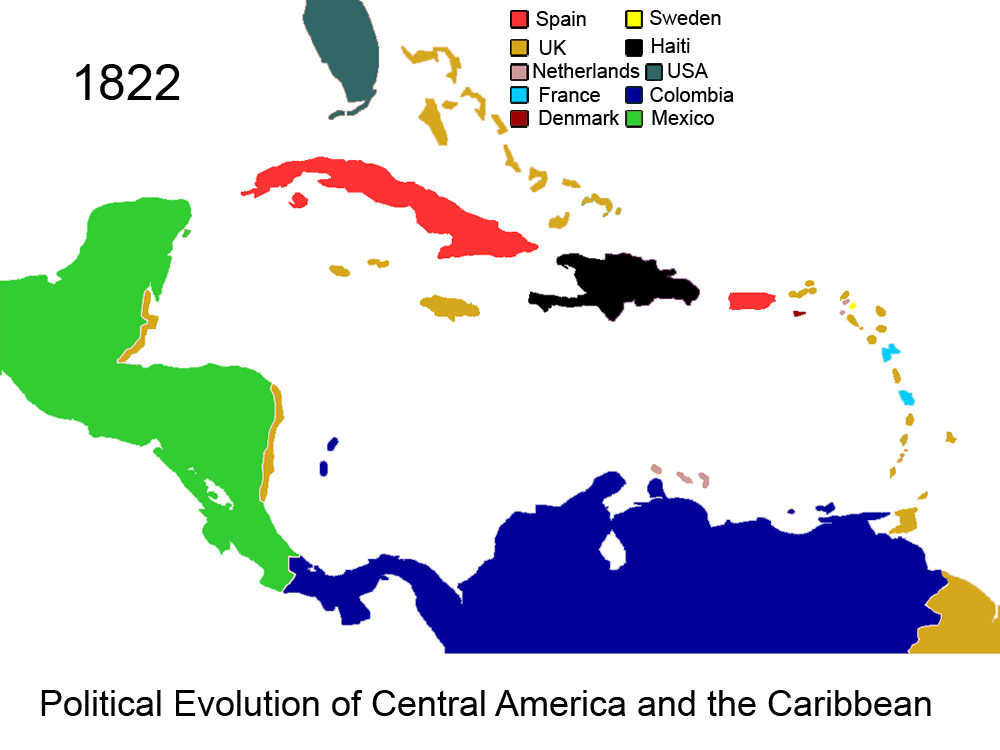

Spanish Haiti's independence was short-lived, as Haitian forces, led by Jean Pierre Boyer, invaded and took control of the country just nine weeks later in February 1822.

1823

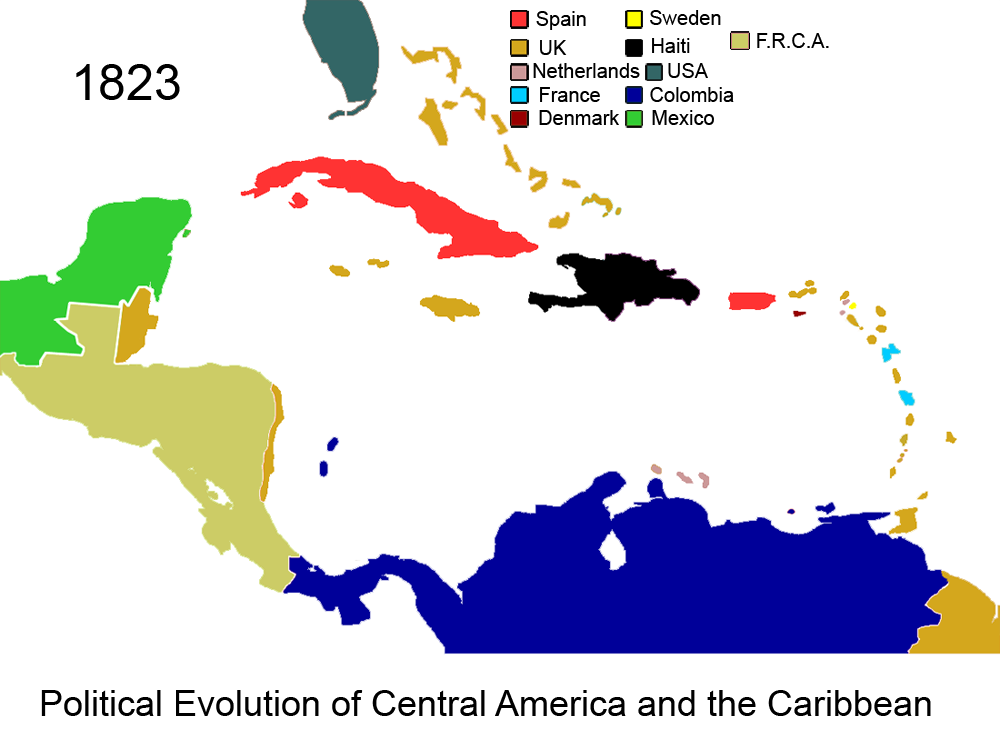

After a brief time as part of the Mexican Empire of Agustín de Iturbide

- Guatemala (which initially included a large part of what is now the Mexican state of Chiapas),
- El Salvador
- Honduras
- Nicaragua
- Costa Rica

became a state in the Federal Republic of Central America on July 1, 1823.

1830

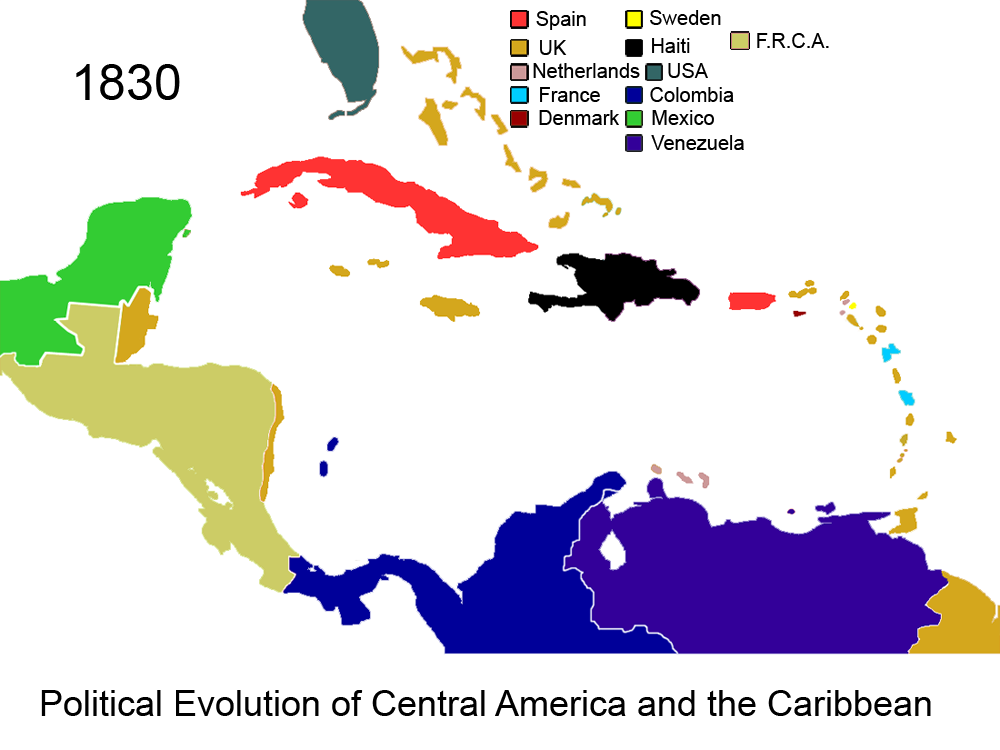

- In 1830, José Antonio Páez declared Venezuela independent from Gran Colombia and became president. Although he was not the first president of Venezuela (which declared its independence from Spain in 1811 and had at the moment Cristóbal Mendoza as head of its executive triumvirate) Páez was the first head of government after the dissolution of Gran Colombia.
- Throughout the 1820s Ecuador was the center of much fighting. First, the country found itself on the front lines of Gran Colombia's efforts to liberate Peru from Spanish rule between 1822 and 1825; afterward, in 1828 and 1829, Ecuador was in the middle of an armed struggle between Peru and Gran Colombia over the location of their common border. The Treaty of 1829 fixed the border on the line that had divided the Quito audiencia and the Viceroyalty of Peru before independence. In May 1830 a group of Quito notables met to dissolve the union with Gran Colombia, and in August, a constituent assembly drew up a constitution for the State of Ecuador, so named for its geographic proximity to the equator, and placed General Juan José Flores in charge of political and military affairs. He remained the dominant political figure during Ecuador's first fifteen years of independence.

1838

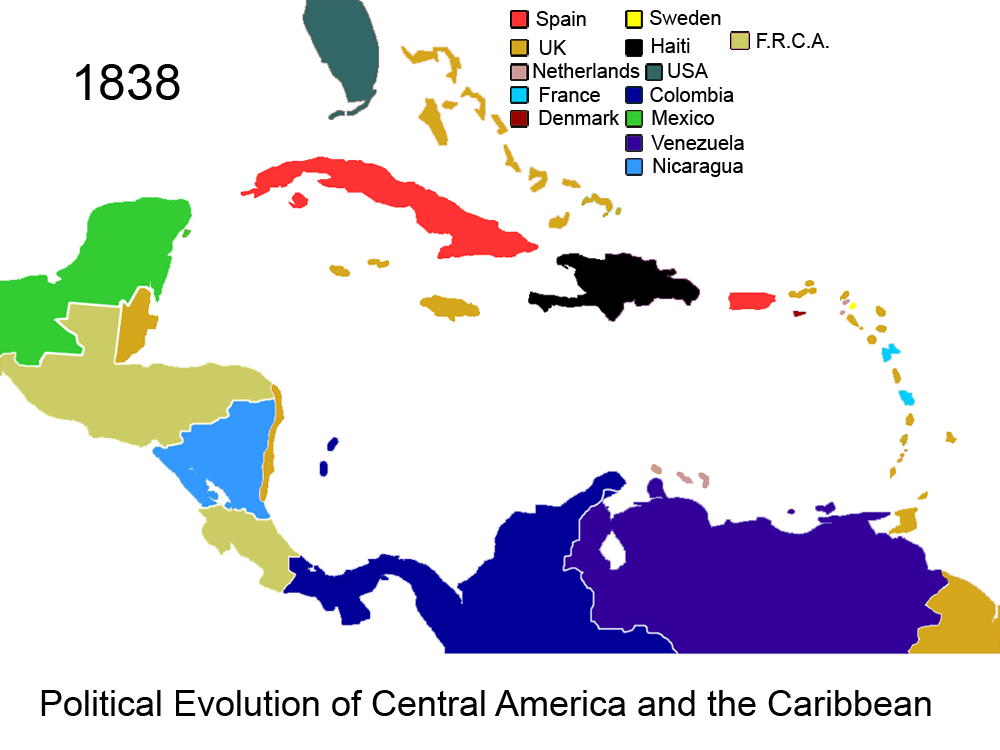

Nicaragua separated from the Federal Republic of Central America on November 5, 1838.

1839

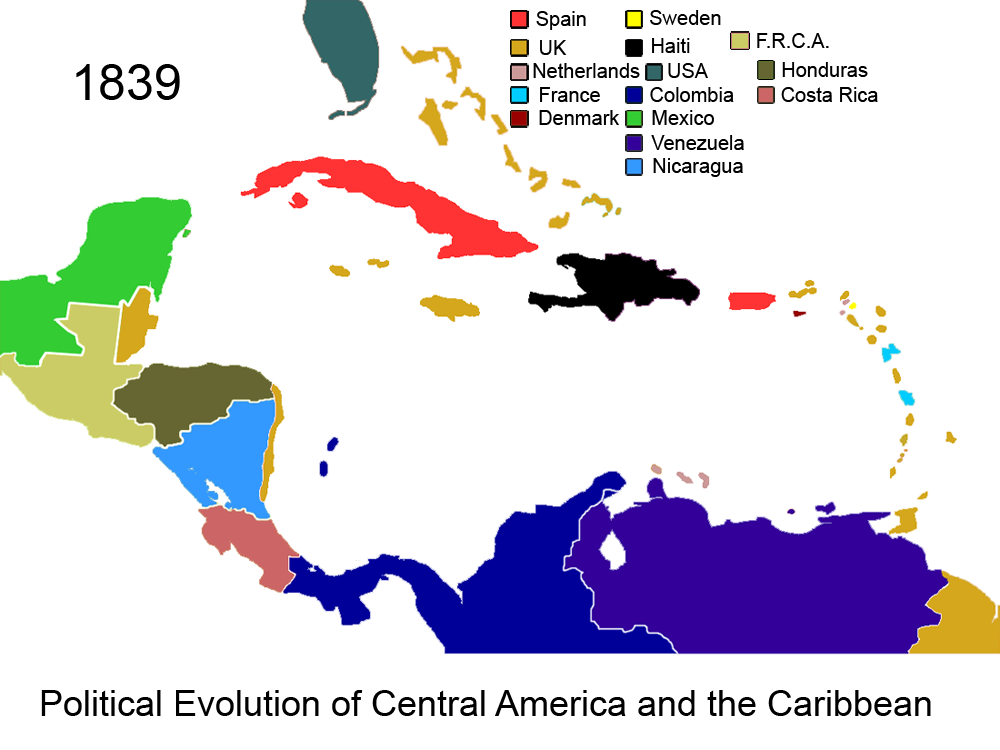

On May 30, 1838, the Central American Congress struck down Francisco Morazán's control over the Federal Republic of Central America. The Congress then declared that the individual states could establish their own governments, and on July 7, 1838 recognized these as "sovereign, free, and independent political bodies."

- Honduras wasted little time in formally seceding from the Federal Republic of Central America once it was free to do so. Independence was declared on November 15, 1838, and in January 1839, an independent constitution was formally adopted.
- Costa Rica separated from the Federal Republic of Central America.

1840

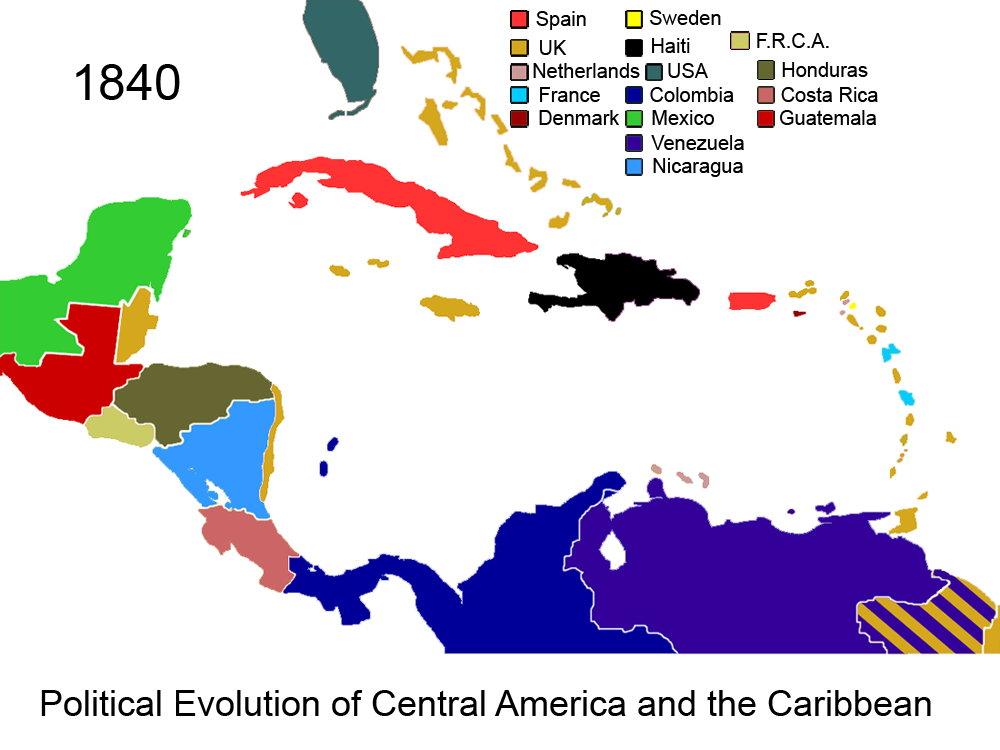

- José Rafael Carrera Turcios was the ruler of Guatemala from about 1839 until his death. In the 1830s Rafael Carrera was an illiterate but shrewd and charismatic swineherder turned highwayman but by 1838 Carrera became de facto ruler of much of Guatemala. The Carrera revolt inspired other Conservatives to revolt against the Federal Republic of Central America, and soon Federal Republic of Central America was at civil war. Carrera was instrumental in leading the revolt against the Federal government and breaking it apart.
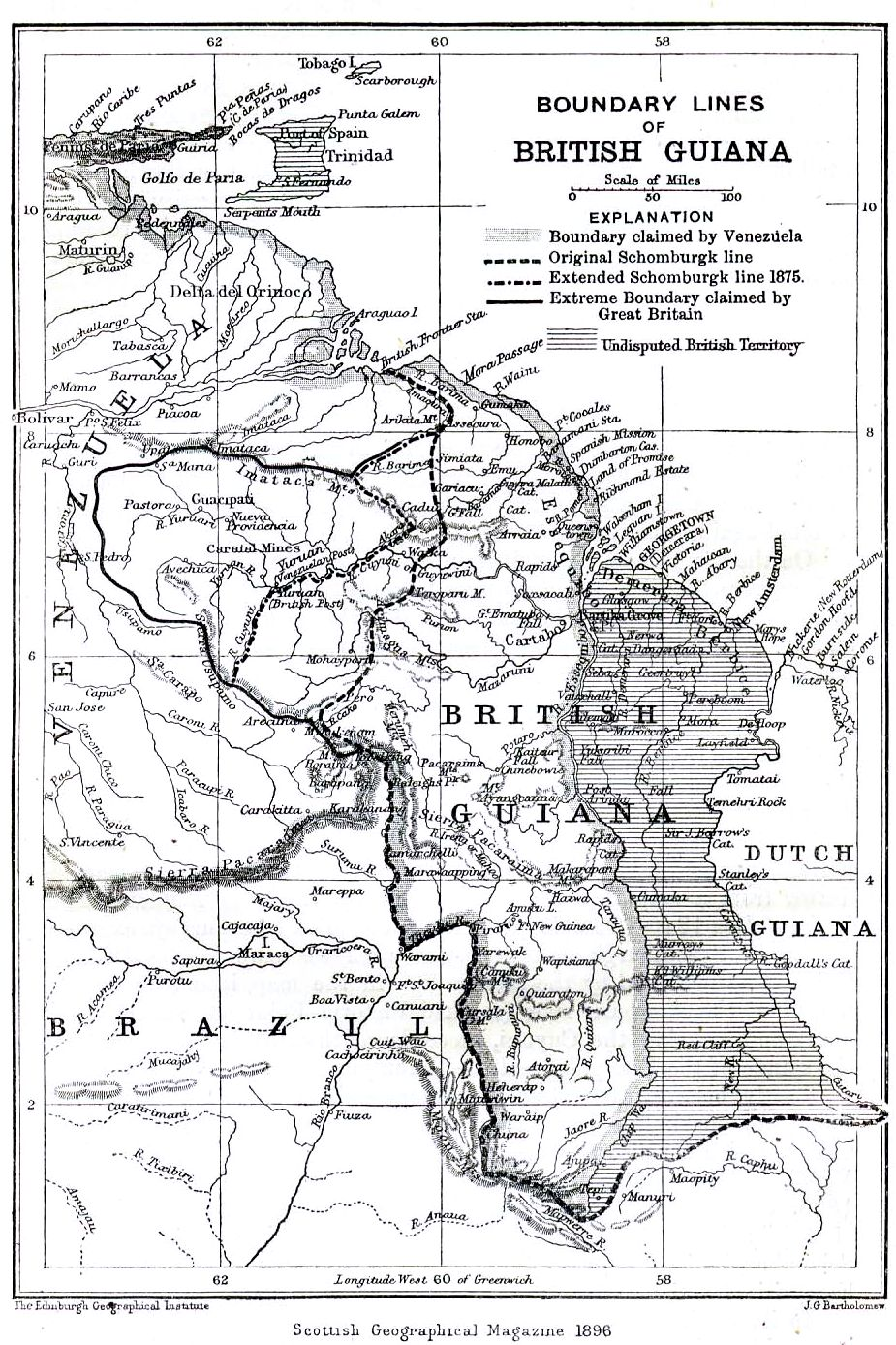
- A map of the borders of the British colony Guyana was published in 1840. Venezuela protested, claiming the entire area west of the Essequibo River.

1841

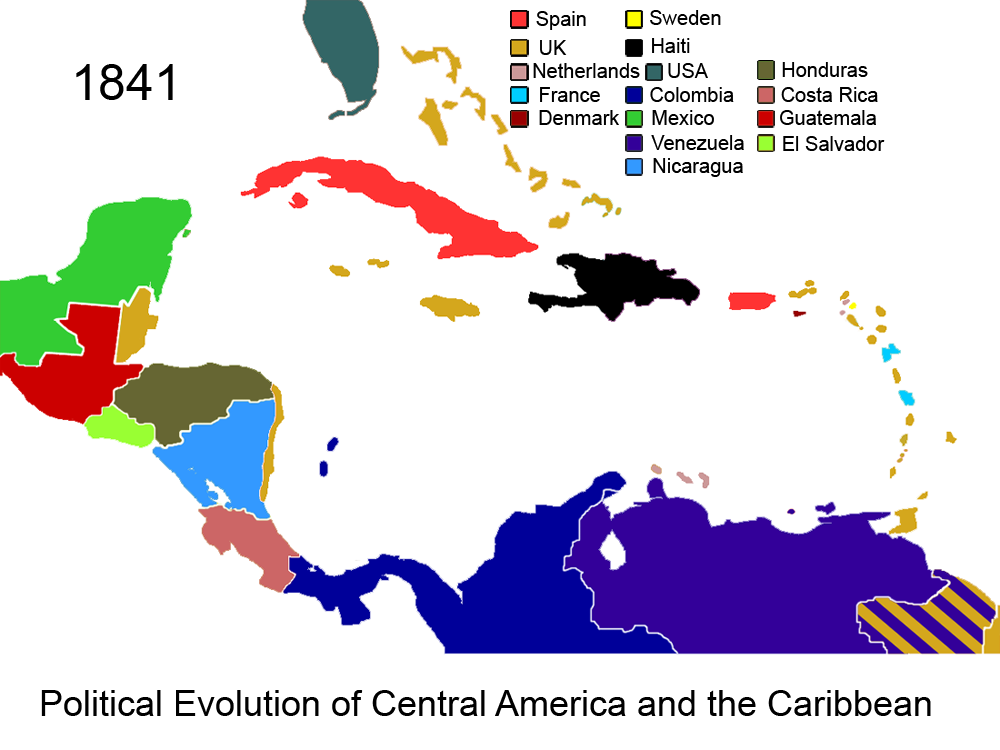

The union was only officially ended upon El Salvador's self-proclamation of the establishment of an independent republic in February 1841.

1842

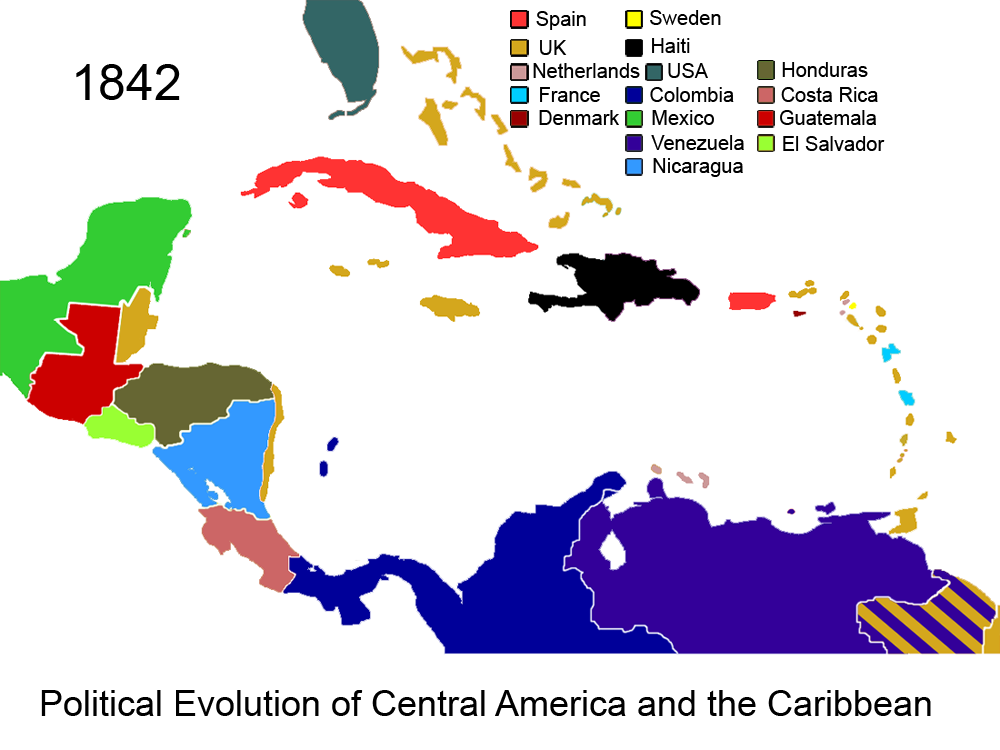

On September 11, 1842, Mexican President Antonio López de Santa Anna proclaimed the "irrevocable union" of Soconusco with Chiapas. The issue between Mexico and Guatemala was not resolved until a boundary treaty was signed on September 27, 1882, when Guatemala gave up its claims to Soconusco and Chiapas.

1844

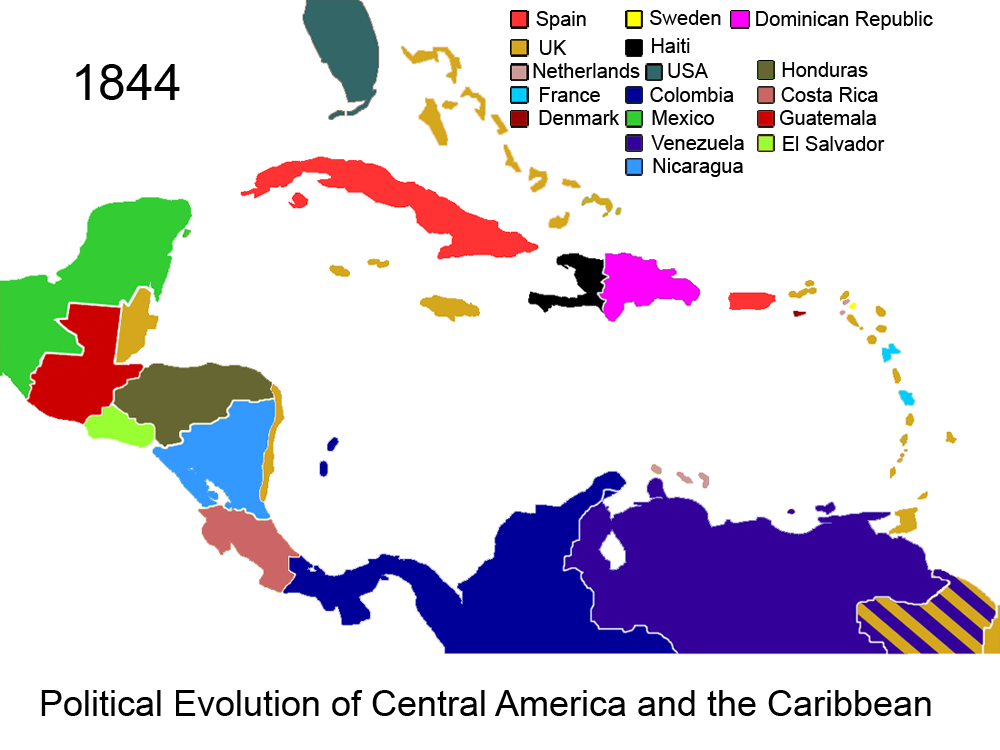

In 1838 Juan Pablo Duarte founded a secret society called La Trinitaria, which sought the complete independence of Santo Domingo without any foreign intervention. Ramón Matías Mella and Francisco del Rosario Sánchez (the latter of partly African ancestry), despite not being among the founding members of La Trinitaria, were decisive in the fight for independence. Duarte and they are the three Founding Fathers of the Dominican Republic. On February 27, 1844, the Trinitarios (Trinitarians), declared the independence from Haiti. They were backed by Pedro Santana, a wealthy cattle rancher from El Seibo, who became general of the army of the nascent Republic. The Dominican Republic's first Constitution was adopted on November 6, 1844, and was modeled after the United States Constitution.

1846

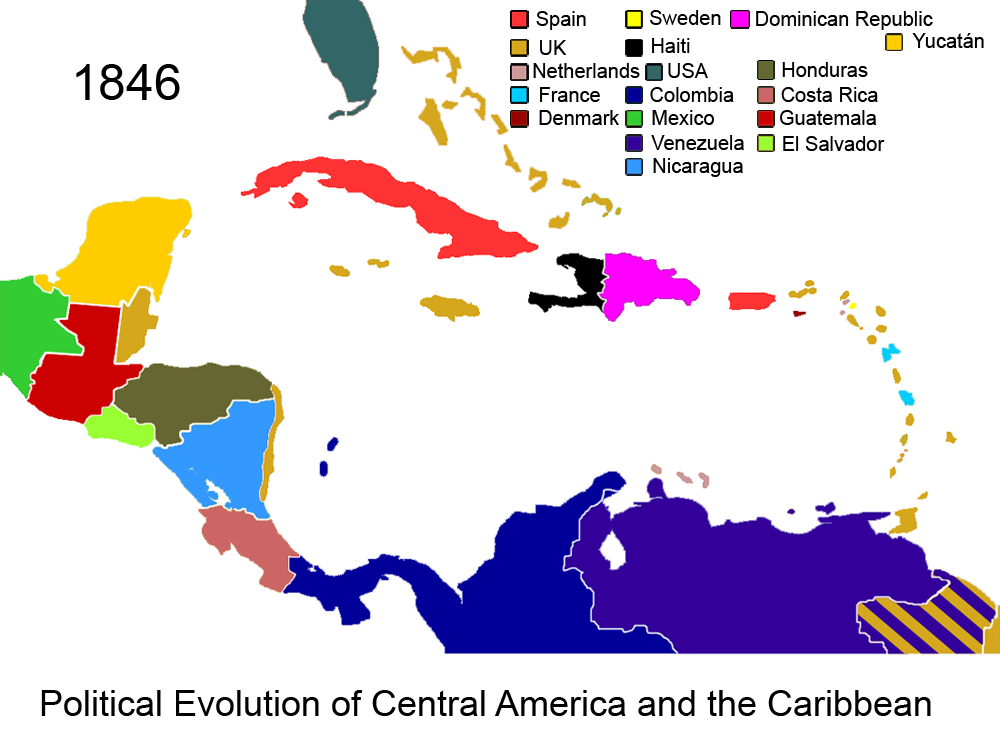

Yucatán renounced the Mexican government, declaring independence as the Republic of Yucatán effective 1 January 1846. When the Mexican–American War broke out, Yucatán declared its neutrality.

1848

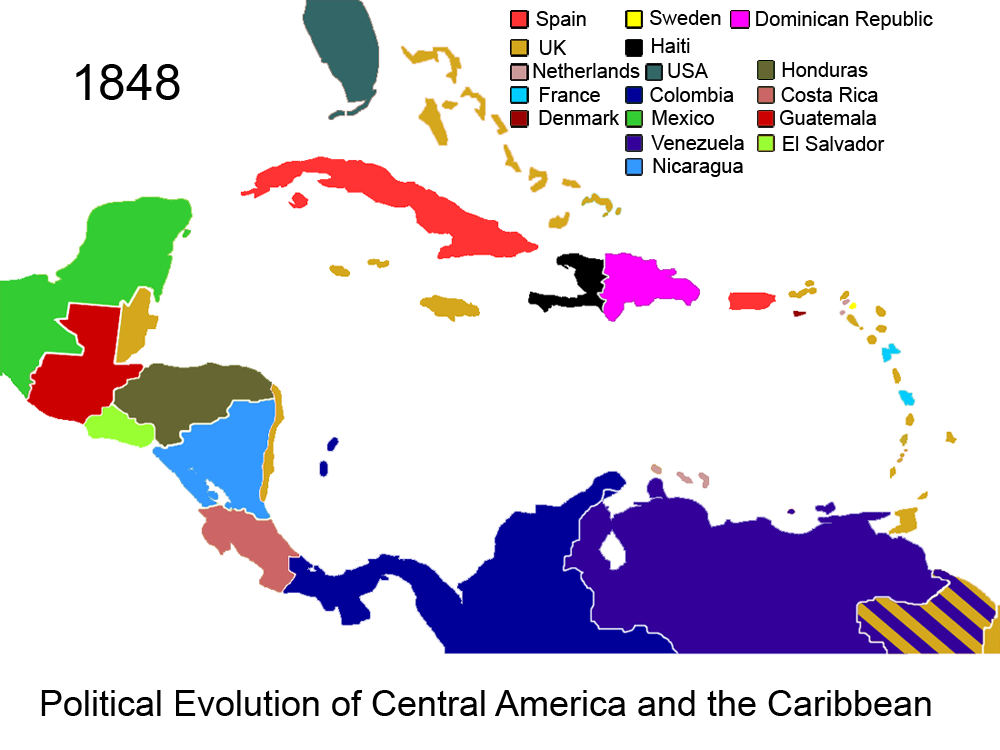

After the end of the Mexican–American War, Governor Barbachano appealed to Mexican President José Joaquín de Herrera for help in suppressing a Mayan uprising, the Caste War of Yucatán, and in exchange Yucatán again recognized the central Mexican government's authority. Yucatán was again reunited with Mexico on 17 August 1848.

1860

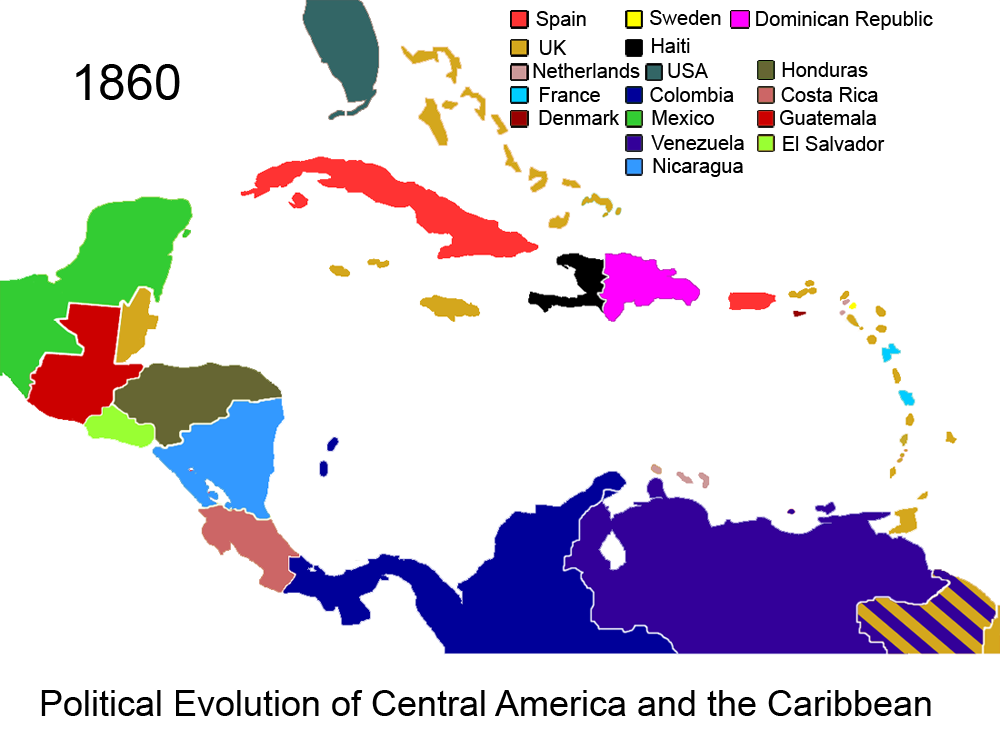

On 28 January 1860 Britain and Nicaragua concluded the Treaty of Managua, which transferred to Nicaragua the suzerainty over the entire Caribbean coast from Cabo Gracias a Dios to Greytown (now San Juan del Norte) but granted autonomy to the Miskito Indians in the more limited Mosquito Reserve (the area described above).

1861

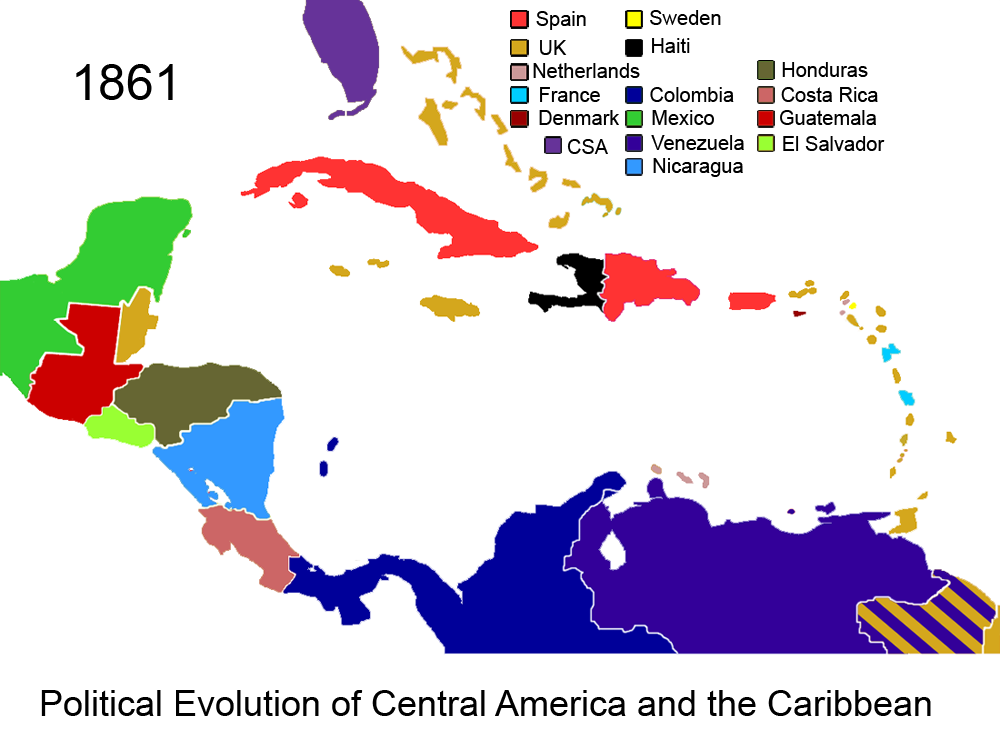

- In 1861, after imprisoning, silencing, exiling, and executing many of his opponents and due to political and economic reasons, Pedro Santana signed a pact with the Spanish Crown and reverted the Dominican nation to colonial status, the only Latin American country to do so. His ostensible aim was to protect the nation from another Haitian annexation.
- Florida as part of the Confederate States of America declared its secession from the United States on January 10, 1861

1863

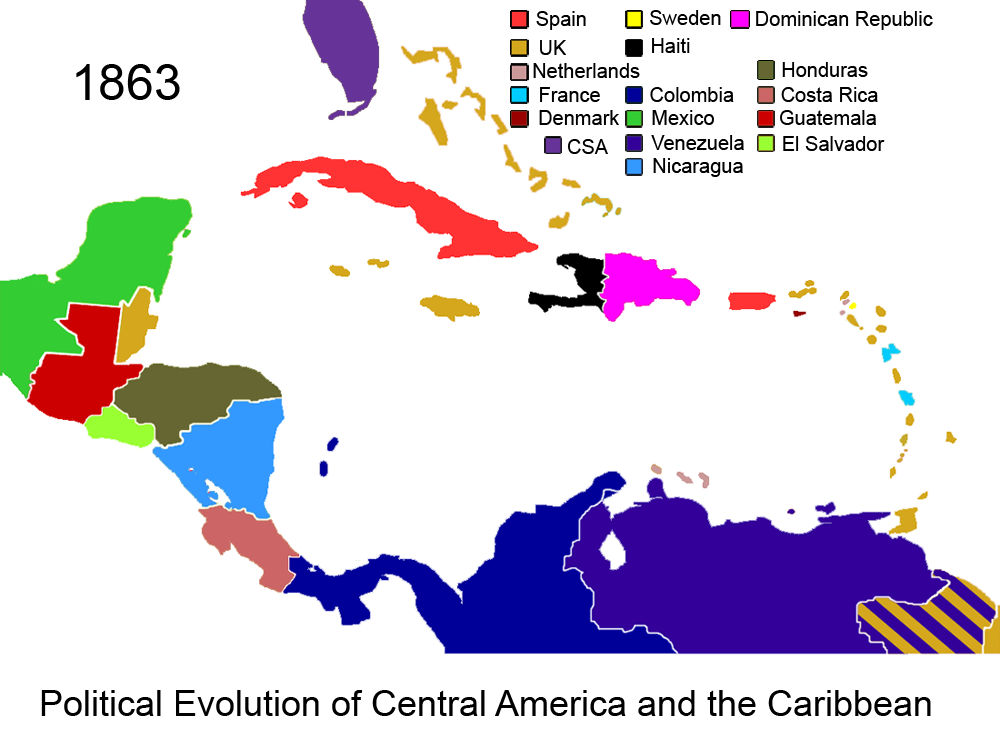

After two years of fighting, the Spanish troops abandoned the Dominican nation. The Restoration was proclaimed on August 16, 1863.

1865

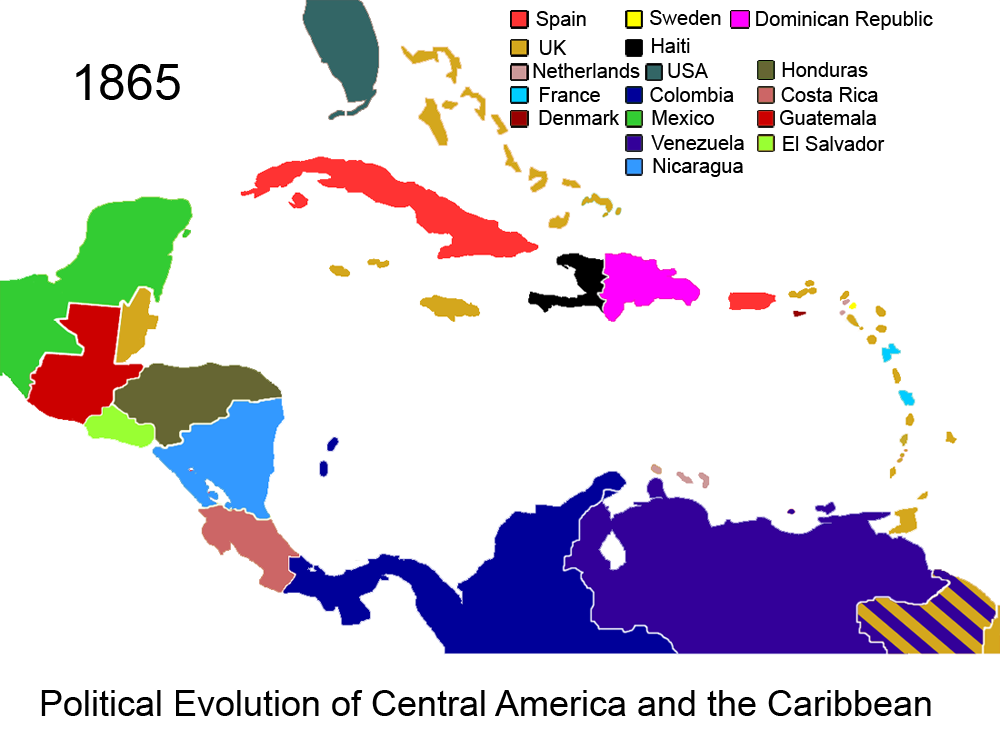

Florida is brought under US control as the CSA falls. Historians generally regard the surrender of the Army of Northern Virginia by General Lee at the village of Appomattox Court House on April 9, 1865 as the end of the Confederate States. Unionists captured President Davis at Irwinville, Georgia, on May 10, and the remaining Confederate armies had surrendered by June 1865. The crew of the CSS Shenandoah hauled down the last Confederate flag at Liverpool in the UK on November 6, 1865.

1878

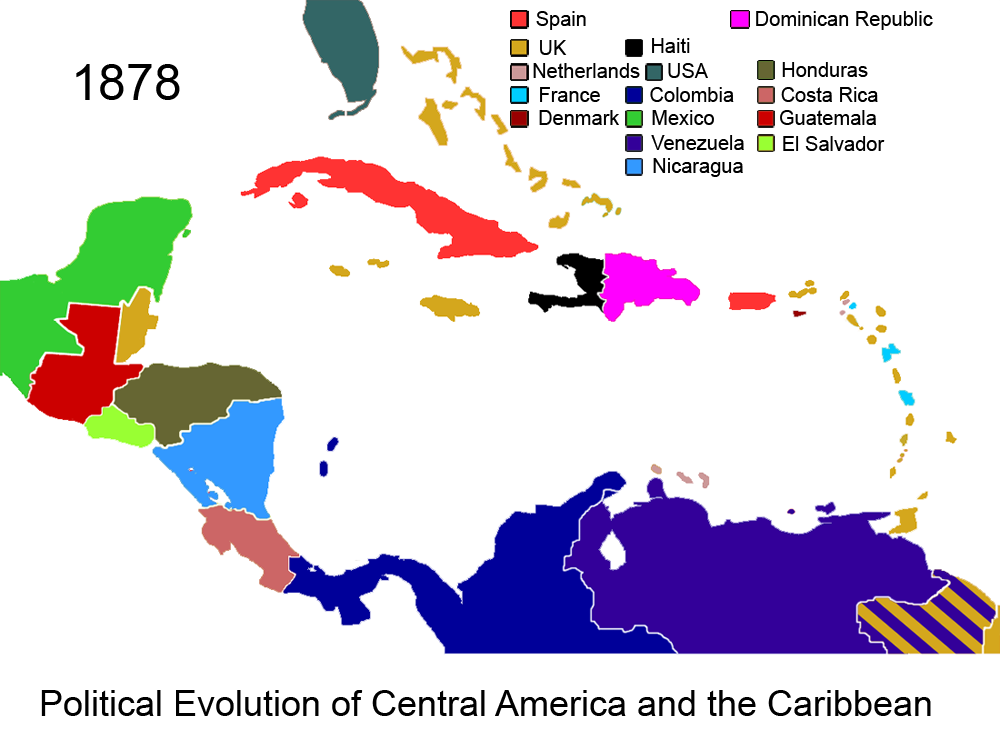

Saint Barthélemy was sold back to France by Sweden on Mar 16, 1878.

1898

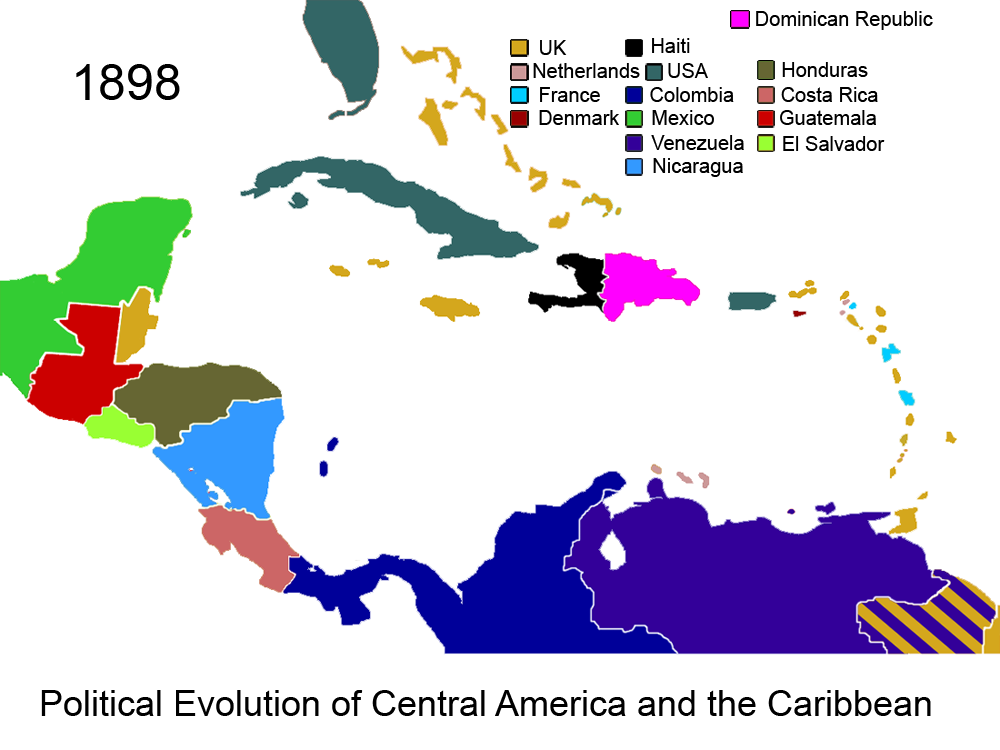

Treaty of Paris (1898) was the result of the Spanish–American War which gave control of Cuba, Puerto Rico, Guam and the Philippines to the Americans.

The controversial treaty was the subject of debate in the United States Senate during the winter of 1898–1899, and it was approved on February 6, 1899 by a vote 57 to 27, only one vote more than the two-thirds majority required. Only 2 Republicans voted against ratification, George Frisbie Hoar of Massachusetts and Eugene Pryor Hale of Maine.

1899

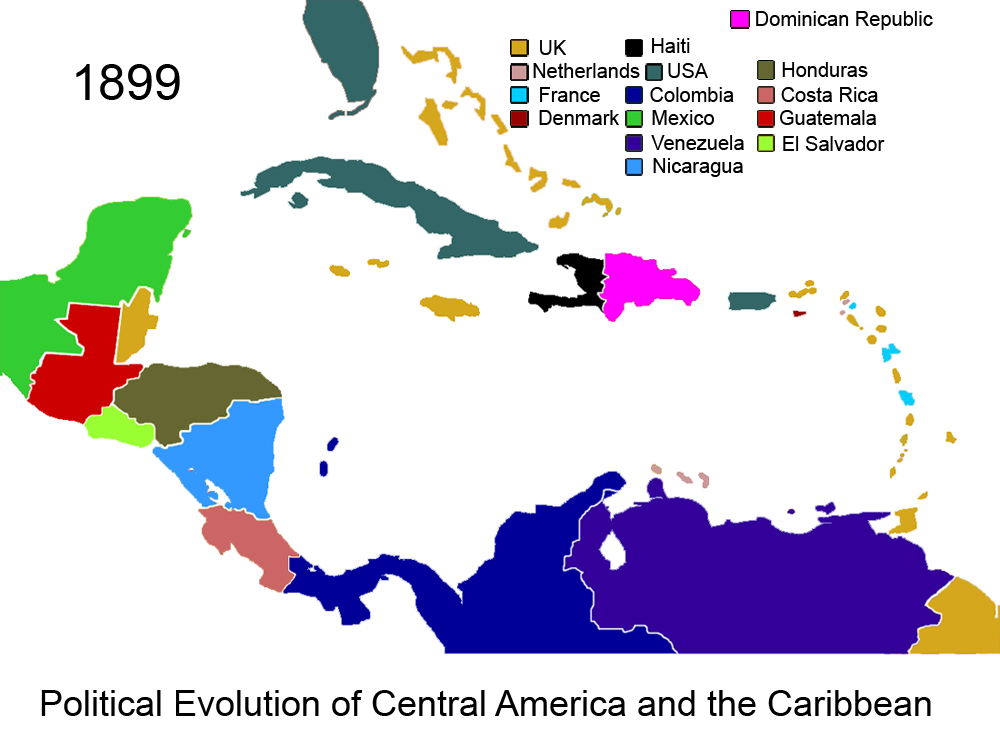

An international tribunal arbitrate the boundary in 1897. For two years, the tribunal consisting of two Britons, two Americans, and a Russian studied the case. Their three-to-two decision, handed down in 1899, awarded 94 percent of the disputed territory to British Guiana.

== 20th century ==
1902

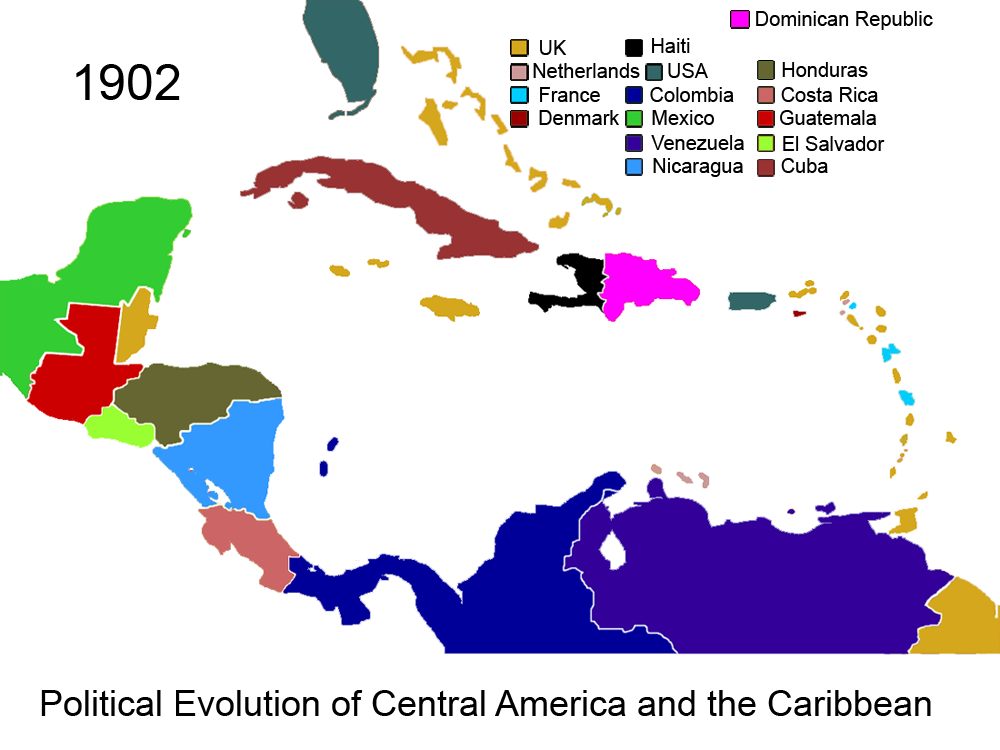

Theodore Roosevelt, who had fought in the Spanish–American War and had some sympathies with the independence movement granted the Republic of Cuba formal independence on May 20, 1902, with the independence leader Tomás Estrada Palma becoming the country's first president. Under the new Cuban constitution, however, the U.S. retained the right to intervene in Cuban affairs and to supervise its finances and foreign relations. Under the Platt Amendment, Cuba also agreed to lease to the U.S. the naval base at Guantánamo Bay.

1903

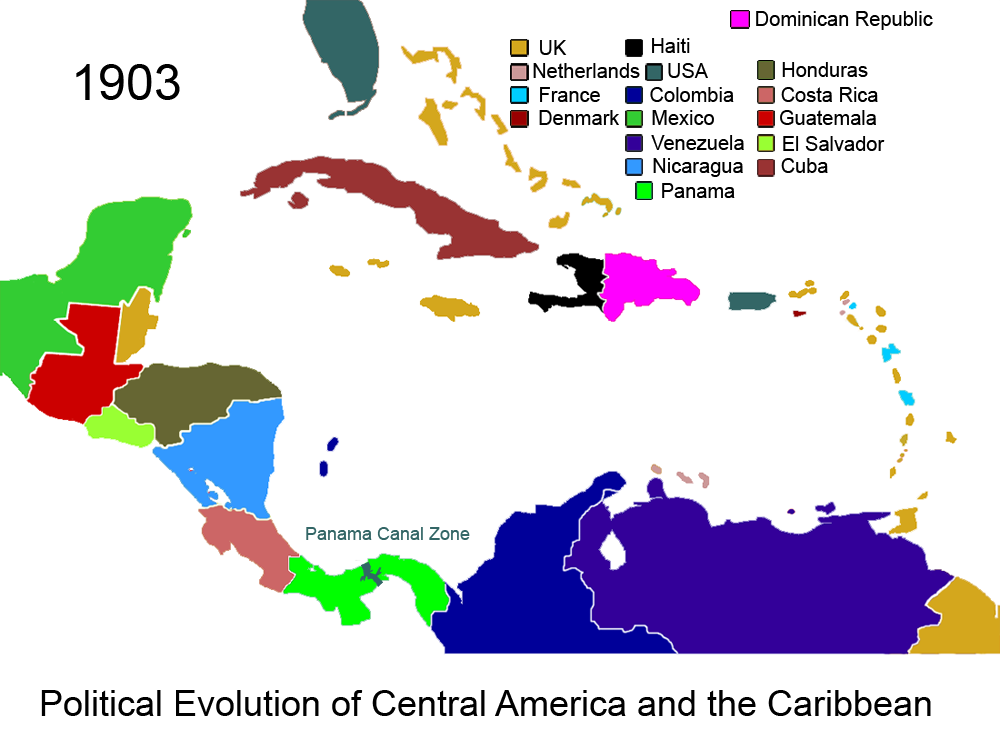

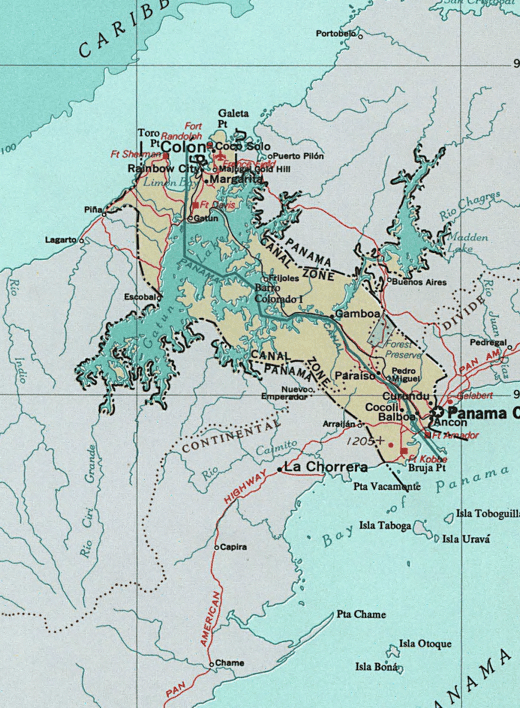
The United States also created the American controlled, Panama Canal Zone.

The Hay–Bunau-Varilla Treaty was signed on November 18, 1903 (two weeks after Panama's independence from Colombia on November 3, 1903). Philippe Bunau-Varilla went to Washington, D.C. and New York City to negotiate the terms with several U.S. officials, most prominently, Secretary of State John Hay. The two men negotiated the terms of sale for the building of a Panama Canal. No Panamanians signed the treaty although Bunau-Varilla was present as the diplomatic representative of Panama (a role he had purchased through financial assistance to the rebels), despite the fact he had not lived in Panama for seventeen years before the incident, and he never returned.

1906

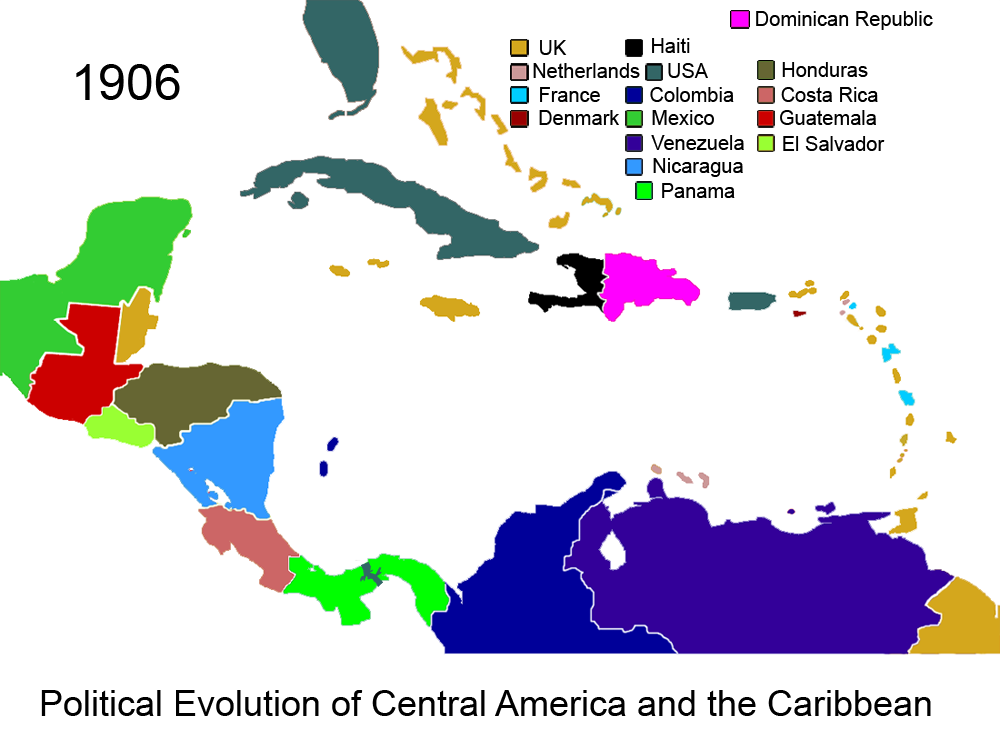

Cuba was placed under U.S. occupation and a U.S. governor, Charles Edward Magoon, after a rebellion led by José Miguel Gómez.

1909

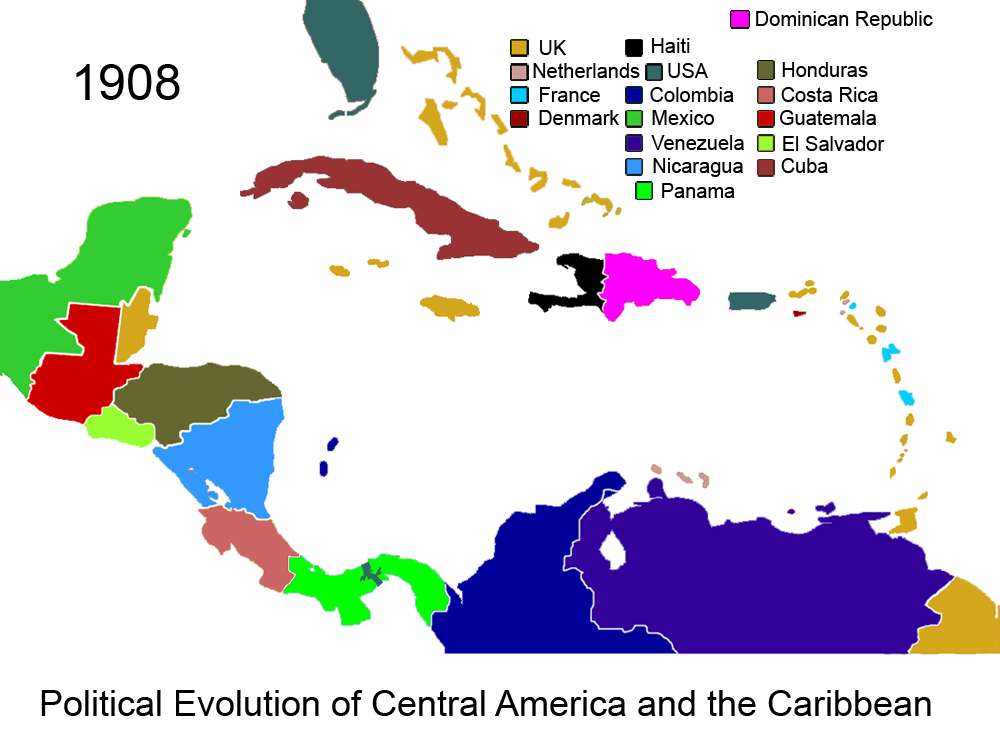

Elections were held in 1908 when José Miguel Gómez was elected president. Self-government for Cuba was restored in 1909.

1915

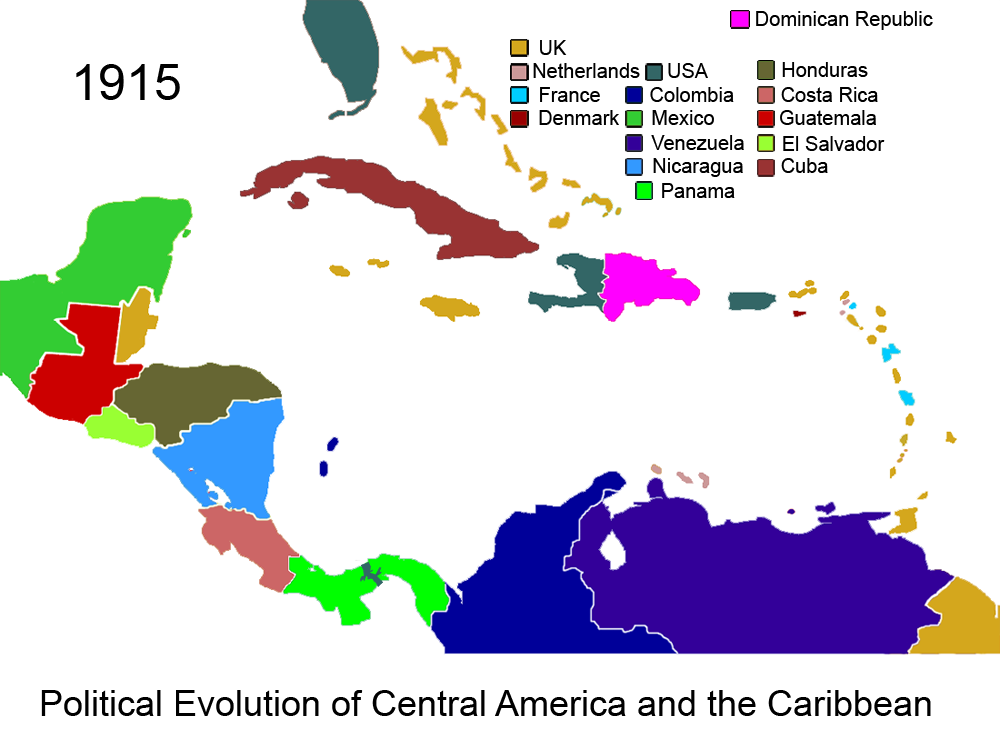

The first United States occupation of Haiti began on July 28, 1915 and ended in mid-August, 1934.

1916

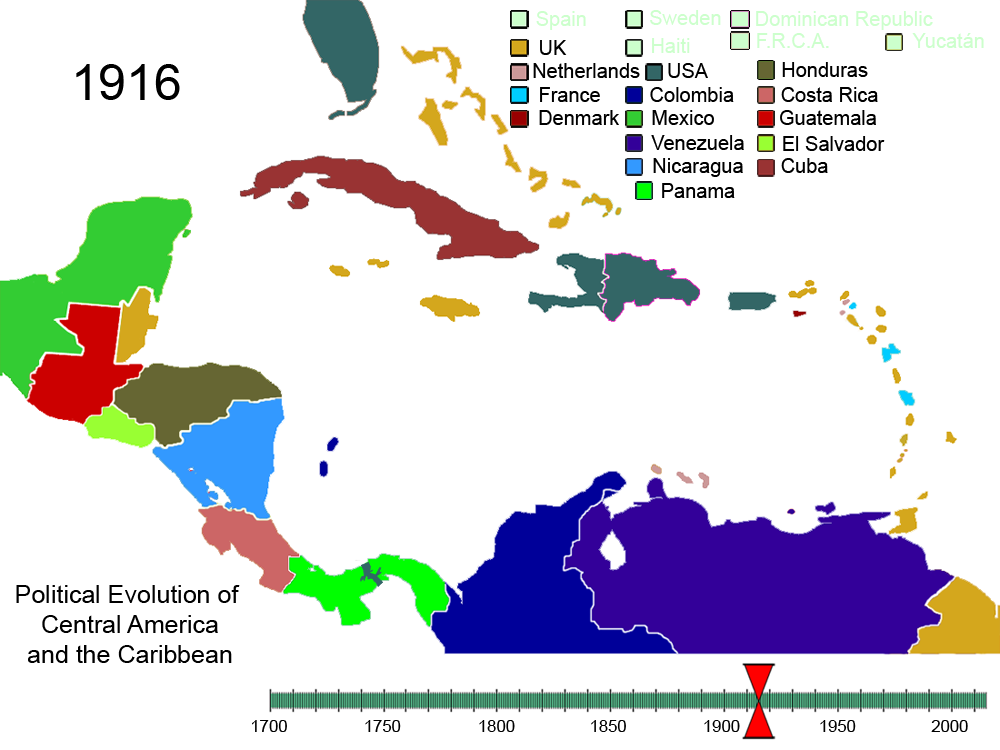

The United States begins its occupation of the Dominican Republic from 1916 to July 1924. By November of the same year they proclaim a military government.

1917

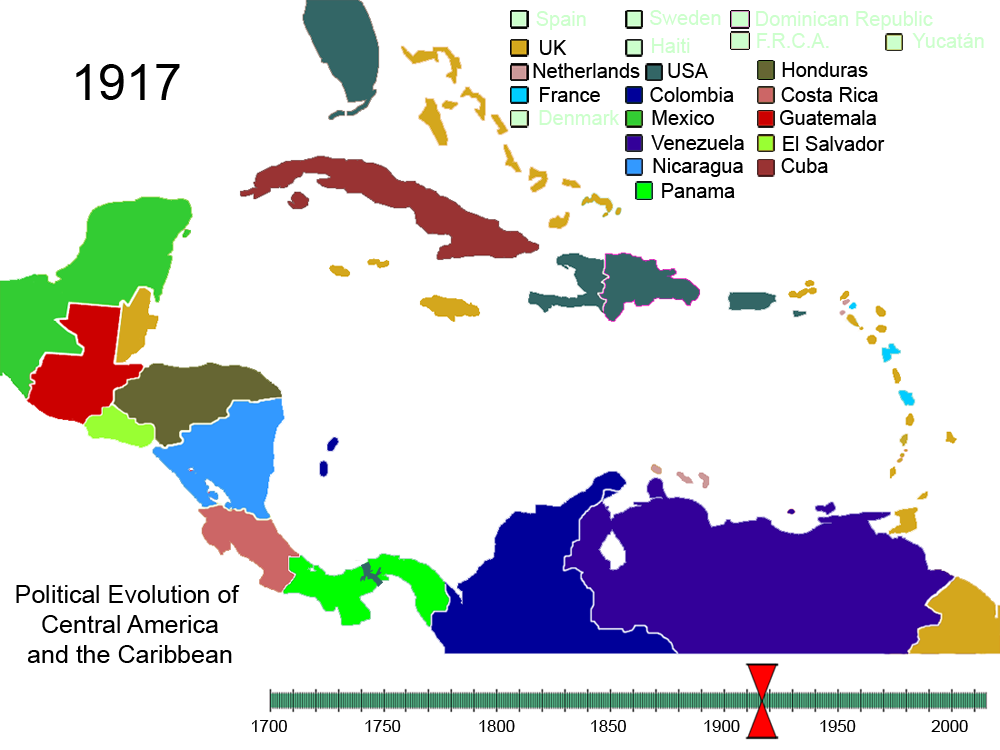

On March 31, 1917, the United States purchased Saint Croix, Saint John and Saint Thomas from Denmark for US$25 million, renaming them the United States Virgin Islands.

1924

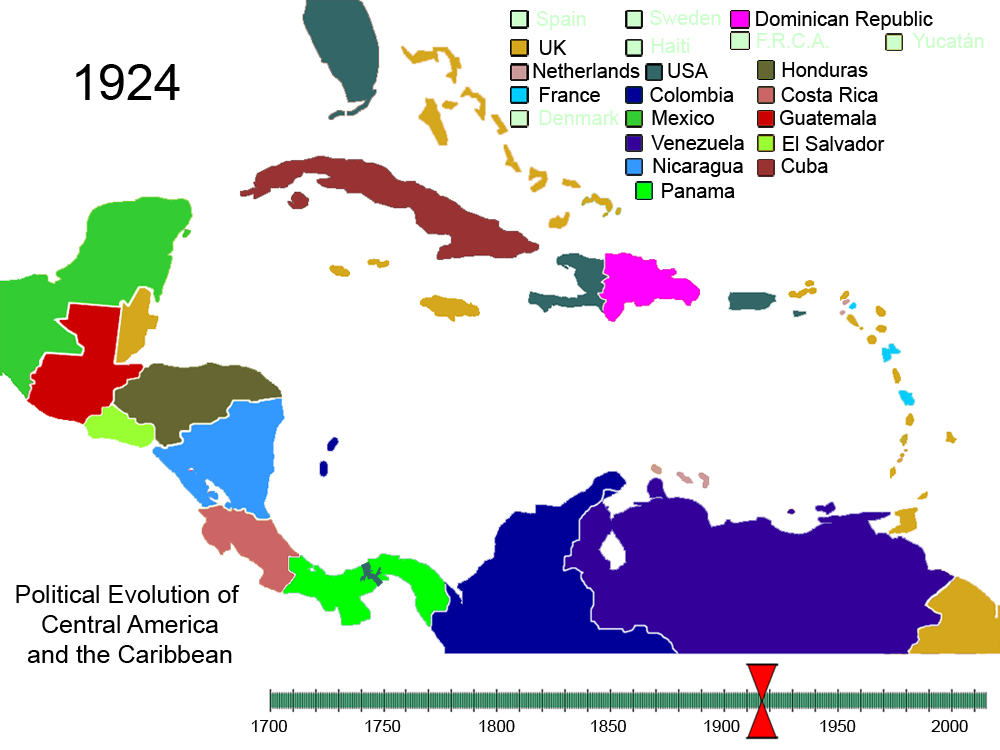

The United States ends its occupation of the Dominican Republic. Horacio Vásquez Lajara defeated Francisco J. Peynado and with his inauguration on July 13, 1924 America ends its control.

1934

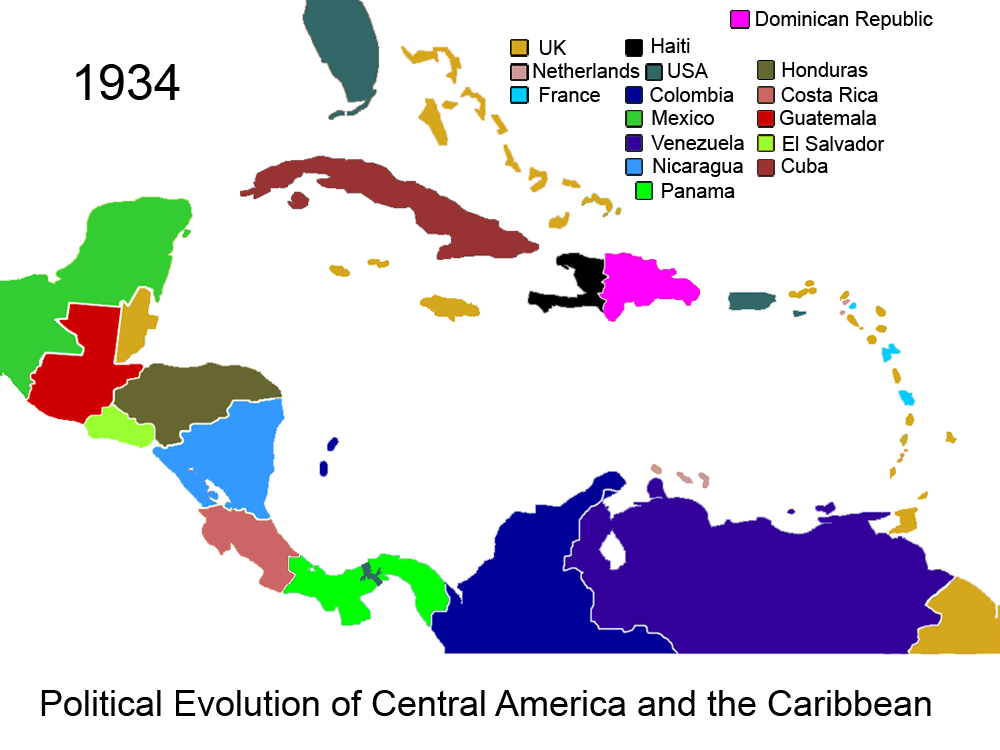

On August 15, 1934 the last American Marines leave Haiti which again becomes an independent nation.

1940

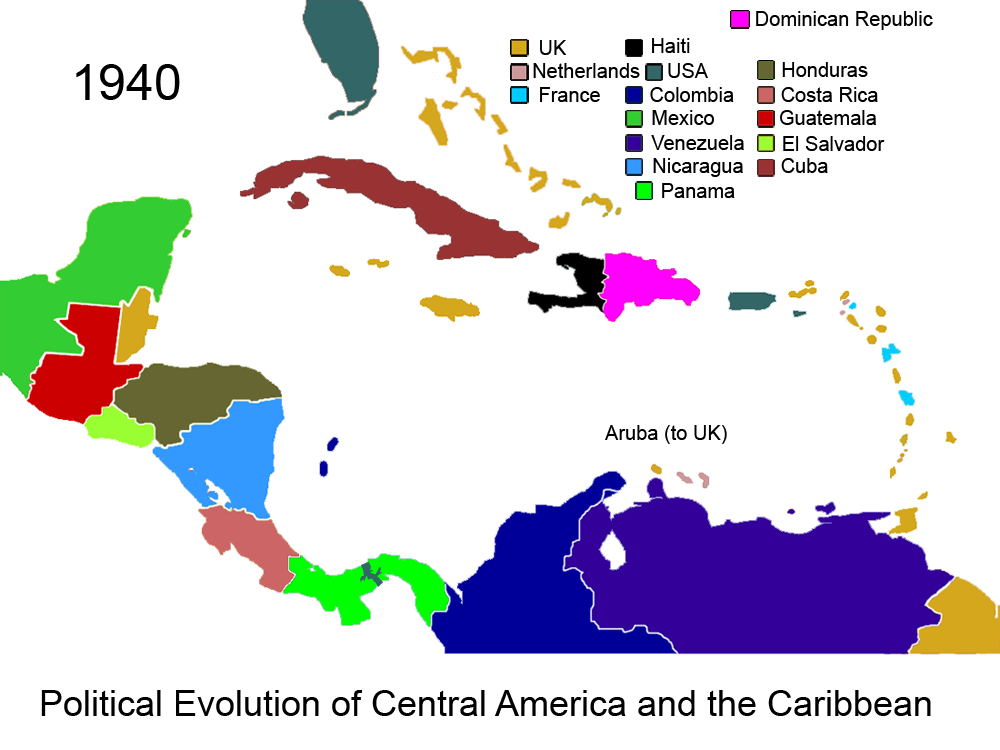

Aruba became a British protectorate from 1940 to 1942.

1942

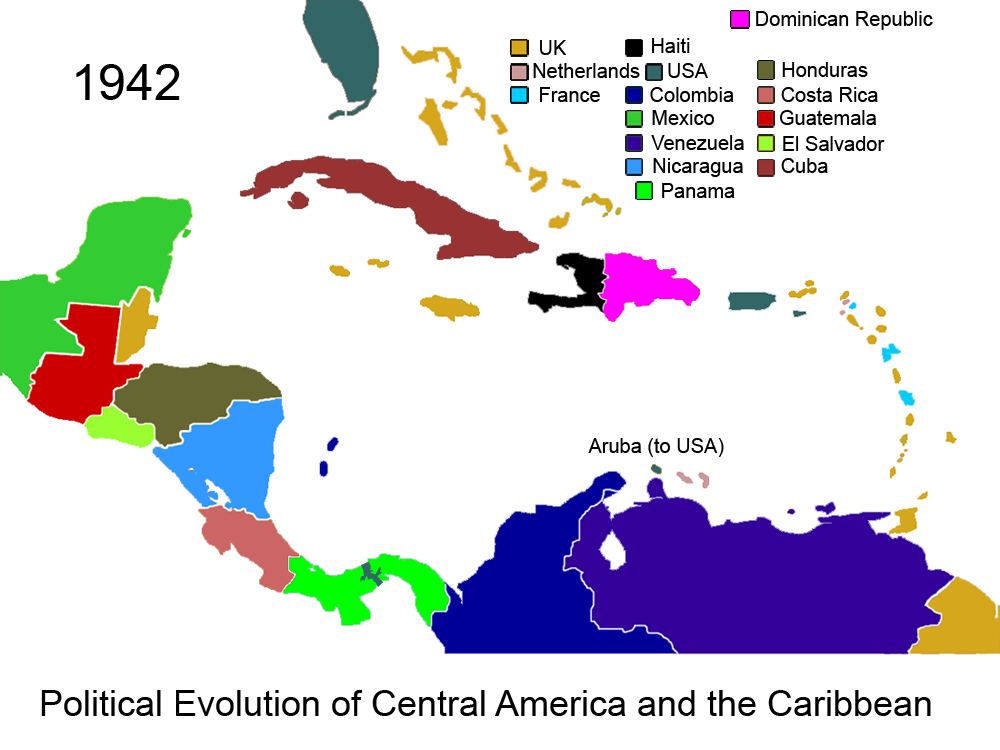

Aruba became a USA protectorate from 1942 to 1945.

1945

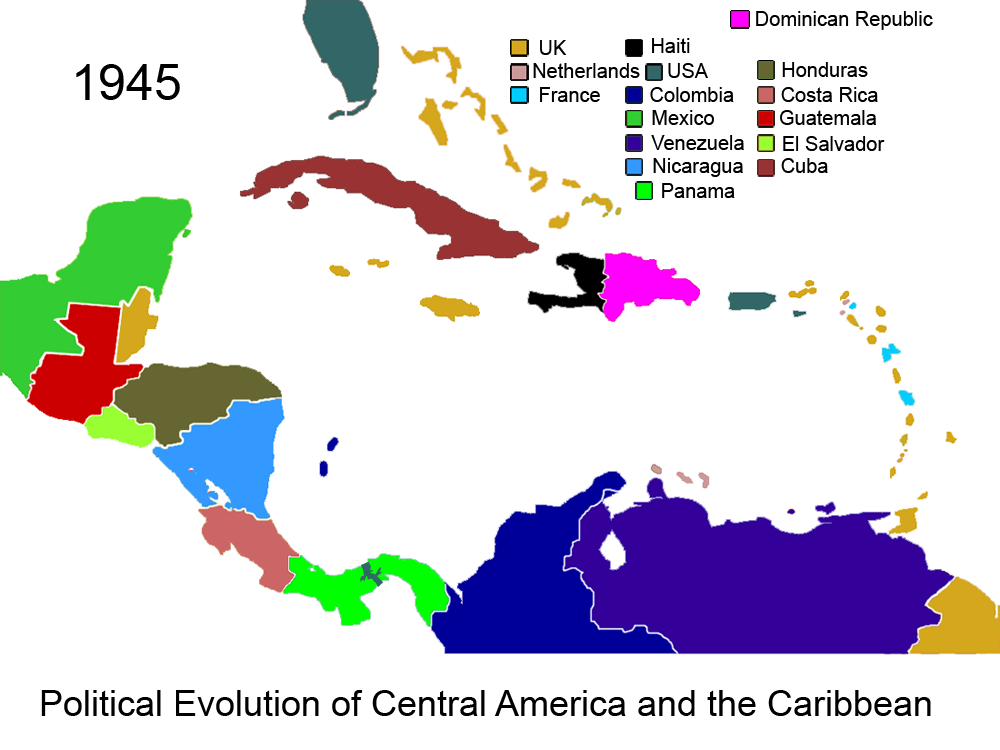

Aruba reverts to Dutch control.

1958

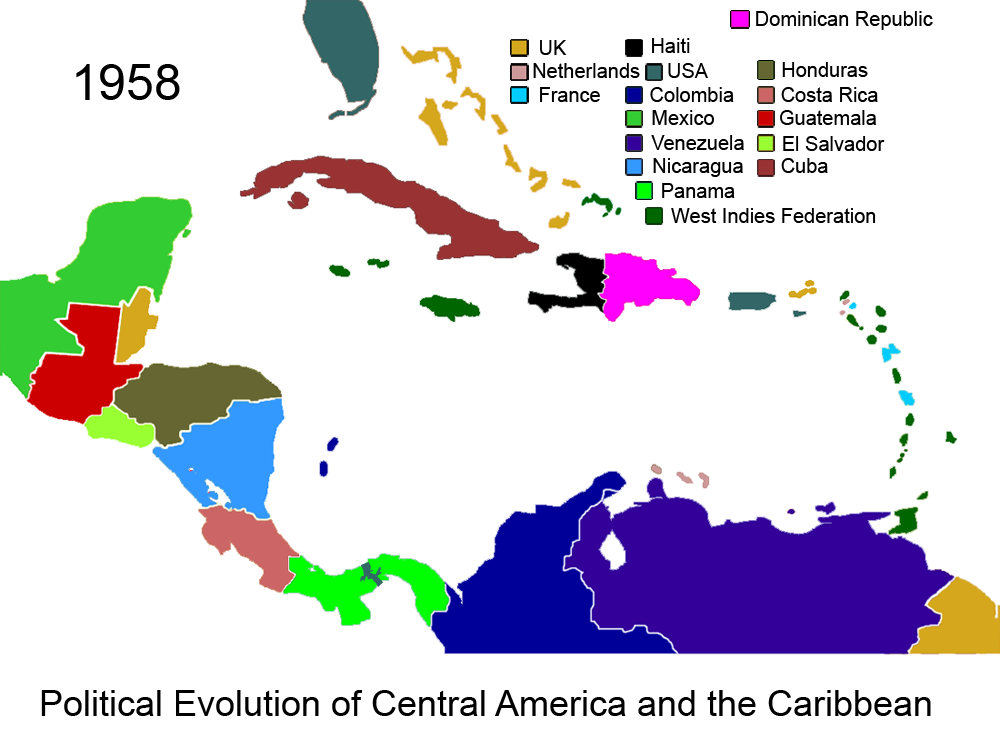

The West Indies Federation, also known as the Federation of the West Indies, was a short-lived Caribbean federation that existed from January 3, 1958 to May 31, 1962. It consisted of several Caribbean colonies including Turks and Caicos Islands, Jamaica, Cayman Islands, Antigua and Barbuda, Saint Christopher-Nevis-Anguilla, Montserrat, Dominica, Saint Lucia, Saint Vincent and the Grenadines, Grenada, Barbados and Trinidad and Tobago.

1962

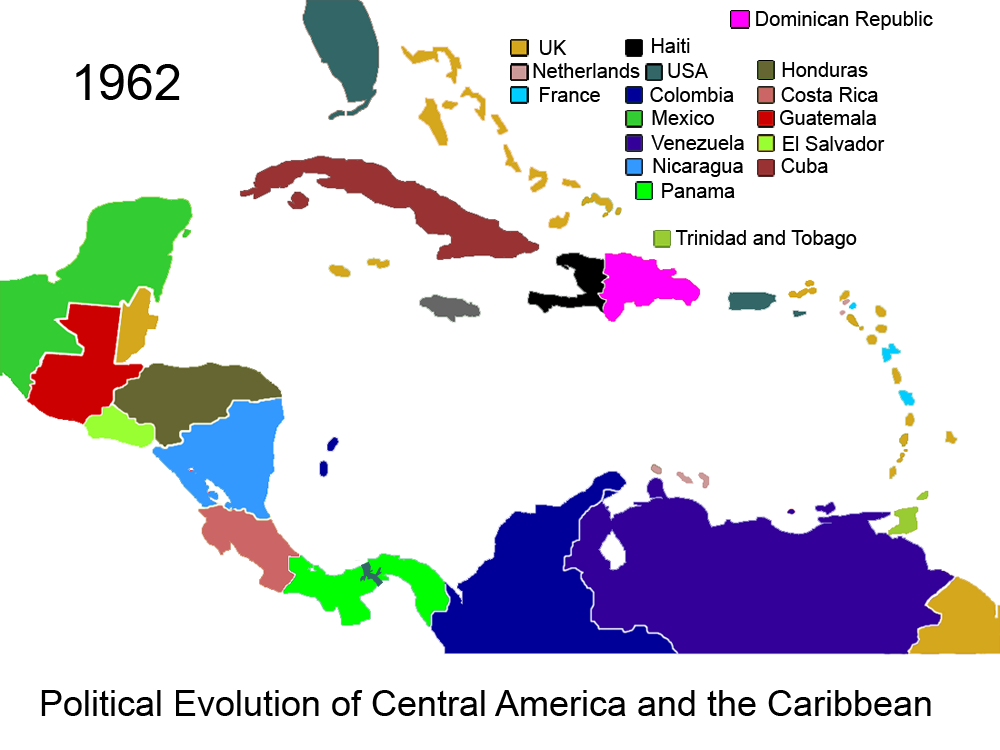

With the dissolution of the West Indies Federation a number of countries decided to go alone and declare independence:

- On August 6, Jamaica
- On August 31, Trinidad and Tobago

1964

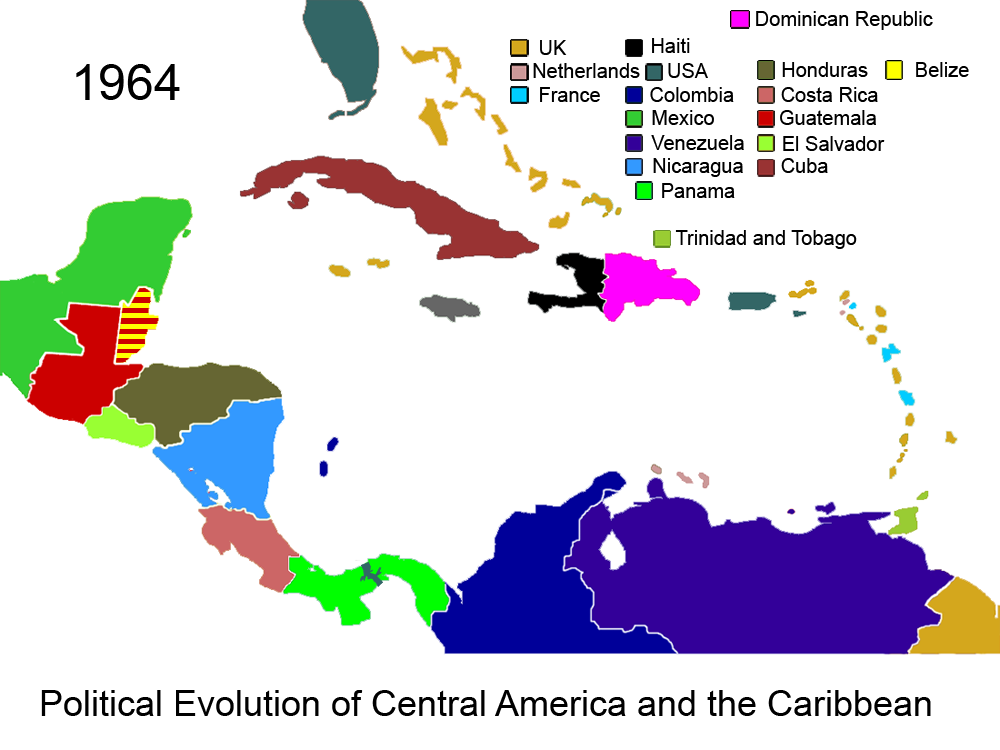

- On January 1, 1964 British Honduras became a self-governing colony in January 1964 and was renamed "Belize" on June 1, 1973; it was the United Kingdom's last colony on the American mainland. The constitution of 1964 established internal self-rule but Guatemalan claim to sovereignty over the territory of Belize delayed full independence until 1981.

1965

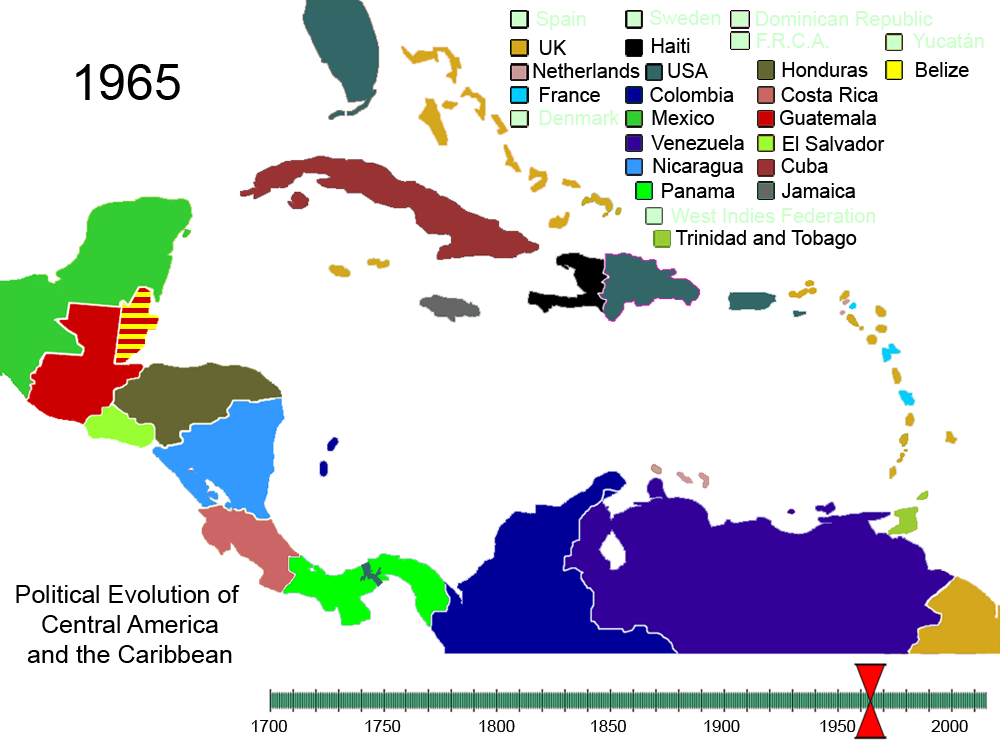

After a period of political instability following the assassination of long-time Dominican dictator Rafael Trujillo the American seize control of the Dominican Republic.

1966

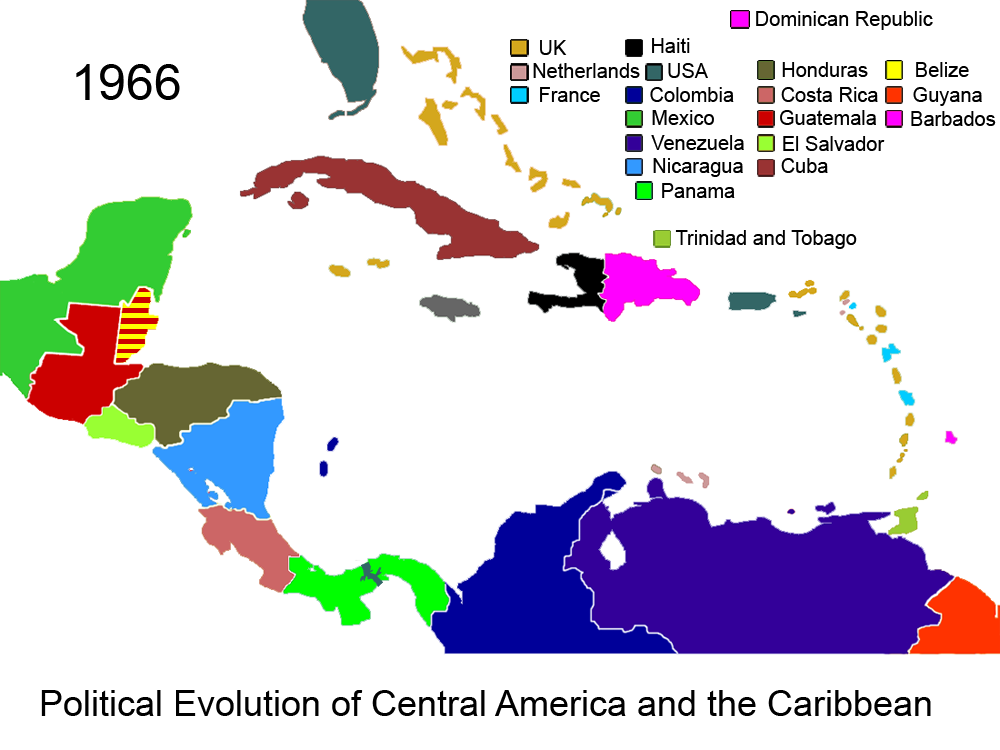

- Barbados gains independence from the UK on November 30, 1966 .
- Guyana achieved independence on May 26, 1966 from the UK, and became the Co-operative Republic of Guyana on February 23, 1970 – the anniversary of the Cuffy slave rebellion – with a new constitution.
- American leave the Dominican Republic and end the military occupation.

1967

Republic of Anguilla declares independence from Britain.

1969

British rule was fully restored to Anguilla in 1969.

1973

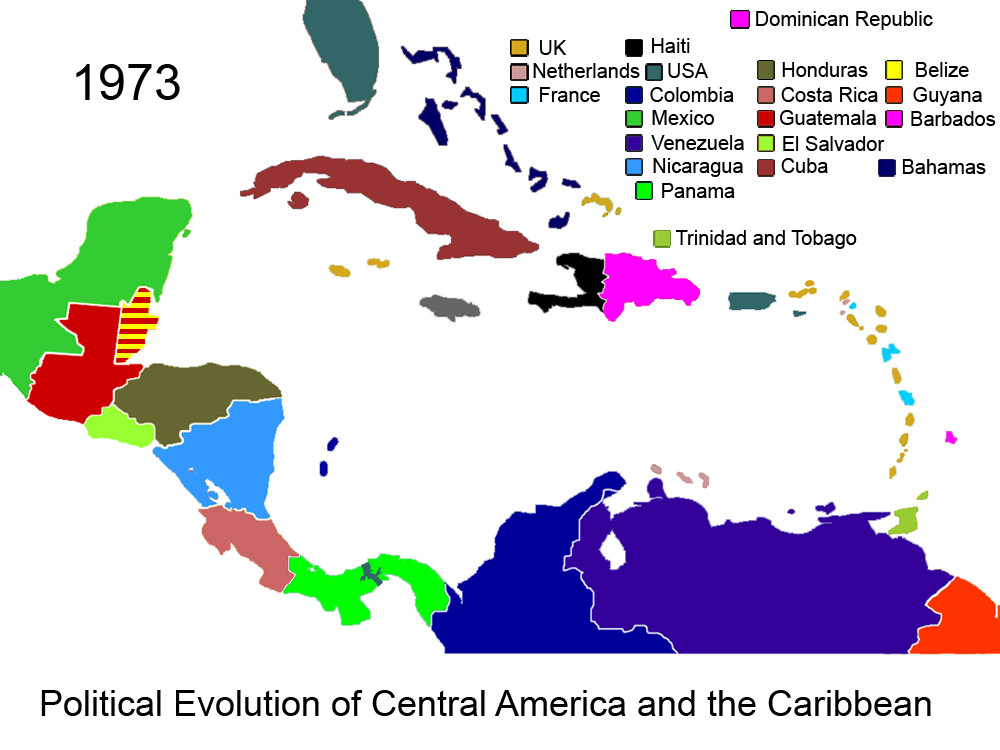

On July 10, 1973, the Bahamas became fully independent from the UK, but retained membership in the Commonwealth of Nations.

1974

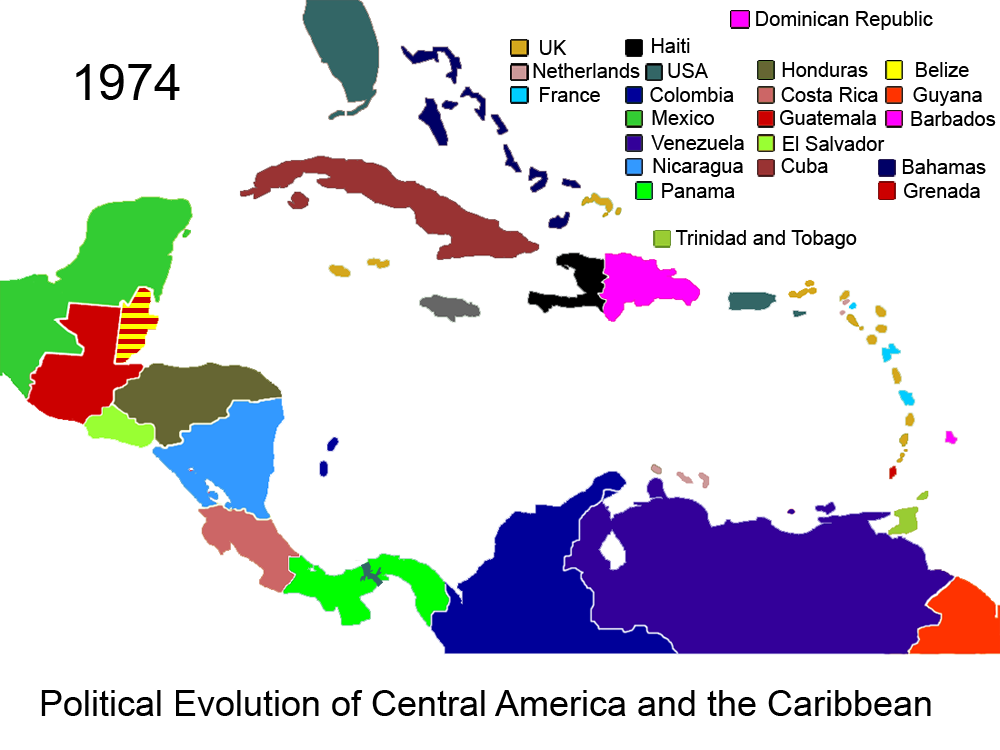

On February 7, 1974 Grenada gains independence from the UK.

1978

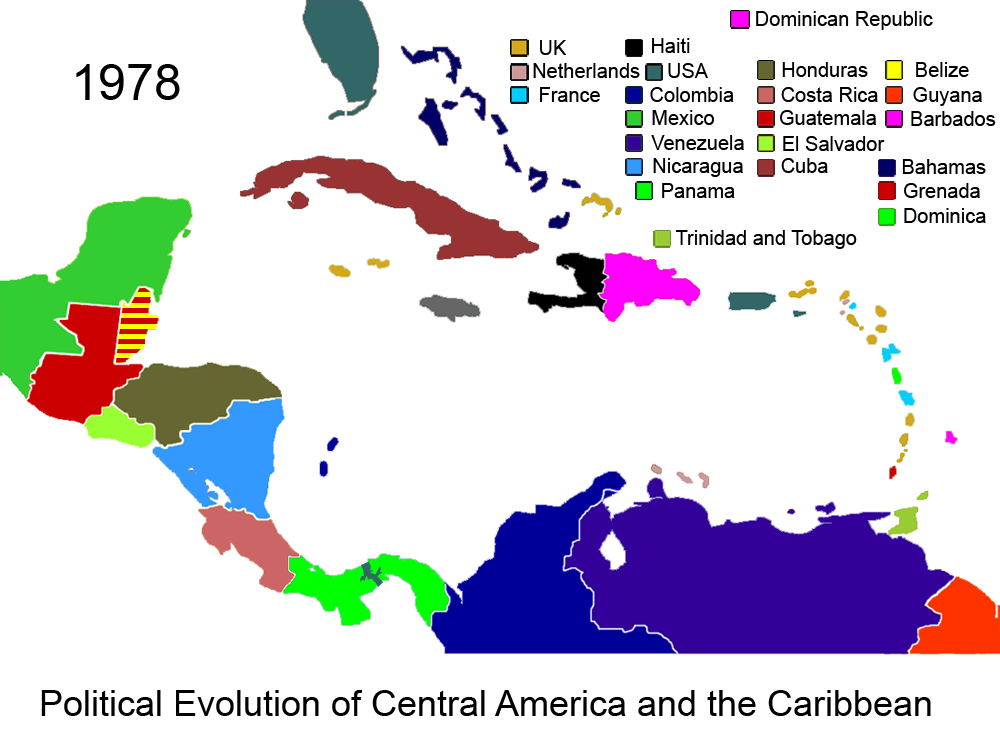

On November 3, 1978 Dominica became an independent nation from the UK.

1979

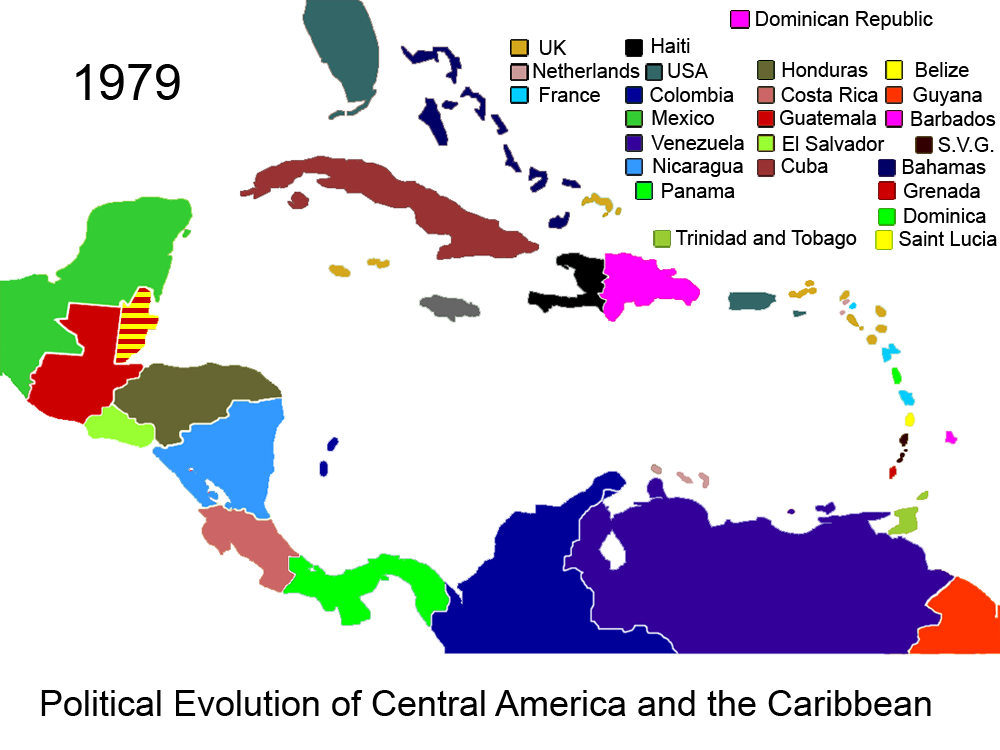

- Saint Lucia became independent from the United Kingdom on February 22, 1979.
- Saint Vincent and the Grenadines became independent from the United Kingdom October 27, 1979 .
- The existence of the Panama Canal Zone, a political exclave of the U.S. that cut Panama geographically in half and had its own courts, police and civil government, was a cause of conflict between the USA and Panama. Demonstrations occurred at the opening of the Bridge of the Americas in 1962 and serious rioting occurred in 1964. This led to the United States easing its controls in the Zone. For example, Panamanian flags were allowed to be flown with American ones. After extensive negotiations the Canal Zone ceased to exist on October 1, 1979 in compliance with provisions of the Torrijos–Carter Treaties.

1981

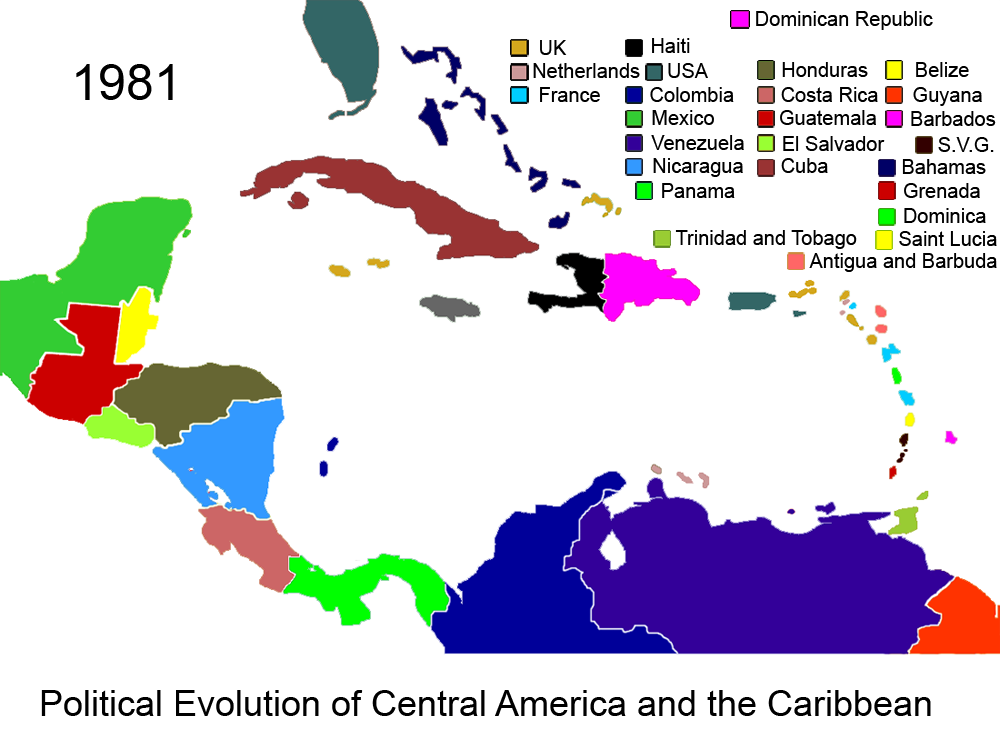

- Antigua and Barbuda became an independent state from the United Kingdom on November 1, 1981.
- The constitution of 1964 established internal self-rule but Guatemalan claim to sovereignty over the territory of Belize delayed full independence until September 21, 1981. Throughout Belize's history, Guatemala has claimed ownership of all or part of the territory. This claim is occasionally reflected in maps showing Belize as Guatemala's twenty-third department. As of March 2007, the border dispute with Guatemala remains unresolved and quite contentious; at various times the issue has required mediation by the United Kingdom, Caribbean Community heads of Government, the Organisation of American States, Mexico, and the United States. Since independence, a British garrison has been retained in Belize at the request of the Belizean government.

1983

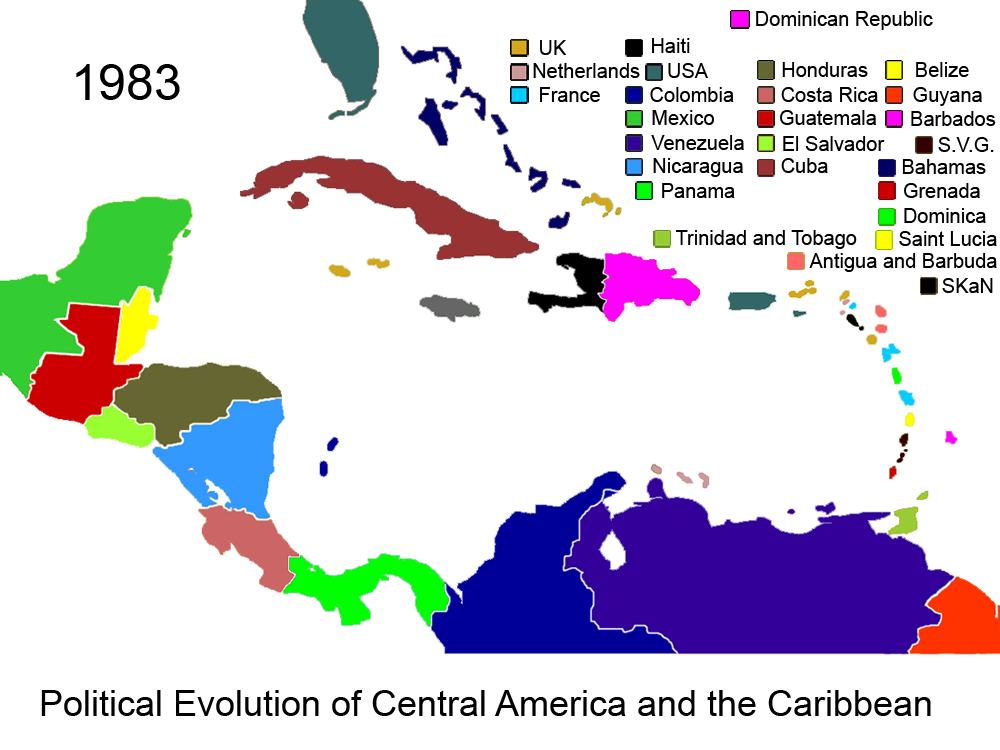

On September 19, 1983 Saint Kitts and Nevis became an independent nation from the United Kingdom.

== See also ==
- Territorial evolution of the British Empire

== Notes ==
- In the following images not all islands are to scale with some being changed to be easier to see.
- After 1902, Cuba has been an independent nation. The Platt Amendment gave the United States involvement on Cuban affairs.
- Not shown is:
  - Navassa Island is a small, uninhabited island in the Caribbean Sea, and is an unorganized unincorporated territory of the United States, which administers it through the U.S. Fish and Wildlife Service. The island is thought to have been claimed by Haiti prior to being claimed by the United States, as far back as 1801.
  - The island of Tobago changed hands at least 22 times altogether between the French, Dutch, British and Courlanders (the Duchy of Courland, at that time a fief of Poland was located in what is now modern western and southern Latvia) and was controlled at times by various pirate groups.
