= Anglo-America =

Primarily English-speaking region of the Americas

- Area: 14,655,937.6 km^{2} (5,658,689.1 sq mi) (area excludes Quebec and Inuit Nunangat)
- Population: 348,006,606 (population excludes Quebec and Inuit Nunangat)
- Population density: 23.74/km^{2} (61.5/sq mi)
- Demonym: Anglo-American
- Countries: 14: Antigua and Barbuda; Bahamas; Barbados; Belize; Canada (except Quebec and Inuit Nunangat); Dominica; Grenada; Guyana; Jamaica; Saint Kitts and Nevis; Saint Lucia; Saint Vincent and the Grenadines; Trinidad and Tobago; United States (except Puerto Rico)
- Dependencies: 8: Anguilla; Bermuda; British Virgin Islands; Cayman Islands; Falkland Islands; Montserrat; Turks and Caicos Islands; United States Virgin Islands
- Languages: English
- Time zone: UTC−03:30 to UTC-10
- Largest cities: List of cities in North America, cities in Guyana

Anglo-America most often refers to a region in the Americas in which English is the main language and British culture and the British Empire have had significant historical, ethnic, linguistic, and cultural impact. This includes the United States, most of Canada, and some Caribbean countries. Anglo-America is distinct from Latin America, a region of the Americas where Romance languages (e.g., Spanish, Portuguese, and French) are prevalent. The adjective is commonly used, for instance, in the phrase "Anglo-American law", a concept roughly coterminous with common law.

== Geographic region ==
While Canada is one of the two principal Anglo-American countries, the province of Quebec and the region of Inuit Nunangat both have non-English speaking majorities, and for this reason they are excluded from Anglo-America. Sint Eustatius, Sint Maarten, and Saba are also not typically included in Anglo-America, despite their English-speaking majorities, because they are constituent countries or public bodies that form part of the Kingdom of the Netherlands.

Population sizes, in 2010
| Country | Population | Land area | Pop. density |
|---|---|---|---|
| Anguilla (United Kingdom) | 14,764 | 91 km^{2} (35 mi^{2}) | 162.2/km^{2} (420/sq mi) |
| Antigua and Barbuda | 86,754 | 442.6 km^{2} (170.9 mi^{2}) | 196.0/km^{2} (508/sq mi) |
| Bahamas | 310,426 | 10,010 km^{2} (3,860 mi^{2}) | 31.0/km^{2} (80/sq mi) |
| Barbados | 285,653 | 430 km^{2} (170 mi^{2}) | 664.3/km^{2} (1,721/sq mi) |
| Belize | 314,522 | 22,806 km^{2} (8,805 mi^{2}) | 13.9/km^{2} (36/sq mi) |
| Bermuda (United Kingdom) | 68,268 | 54 km^{2} (21 mi^{2}) | 1,264.2/km^{2} (3,274/sq mi) |
| British Virgin Islands (United Kingdom) | 24,939 | 151 km^{2} (58 mi^{2}) | 165.2/km^{2} (428/sq mi) |
| Canada (exc. Quebec and Inuit Nunangat) | 31,164,858 | 5,243,788 km^{2} (2,024,638 mi^{2}) | 5.9/km^{2} (15/sq mi) |
| Cayman Islands (United Kingdom) | 50,209 | 264 km^{2} (102 mi^{2}) | 198.2/km^{2} (513/sq mi) |
| Dominica | 72,813 | 751 km^{2} (290 mi^{2}) | 97.0/km^{2} (251/sq mi) |
| Grenada | 107,818 | 344 km^{2} (133 mi^{2}) | 313.4/km^{2} (812/sq mi) |
| Guyana | 748,486 | 196,849 km^{2} (76,004 mi^{2}) | 3.8/km^{2} (9.8/sq mi) |
| Jamaica | 2,847,232 | 10,831 km^{2} (4,182 mi^{2}) | 262.9/km^{2} (681/sq mi) |
| Saint Kitts and Nevis | 49,898 | 261 km^{2} (101 mi^{2}) | 191.2/km^{2} (495/sq mi) |
| Saint Lucia | 160,922 | 606 km^{2} (234 mi^{2}) | 265.5/km^{2} (688/sq mi) |
| Saint Vincent and the Grenadines | 104,217 | 389 km^{2} (150 mi^{2}) | 267.9/km^{2} (694/sq mi) |
| Trinidad and Tobago | 1,228,691 | 5,128 km^{2} (1,980 mi^{2}) | 239.6/km^{2} (621/sq mi) |
| Turks and Caicos Islands (United Kingdom) | 23,528 | 430 km^{2} (170 mi^{2}) | 104/km^{2} (270/sq mi) |
| United States | 310,232,863 | 9,161,966 km^{2} (3,537,455 mi^{2}) | 33.9/km^{2} (88/sq mi) |
| United States Virgin Islands (United States) | 109,775 | 346 km^{2} (134 mi^{2}) | 317.3/km^{2} (822/sq mi) |

== Ethnic groups ==
Ethnic distribution
| Country | Blacks | Mulattoes | Asians | Hispanics | Whites |
|---|---|---|---|---|---|
| Anguilla (United Kingdom) | 90% | 5% | – | – | 5% |
| Antigua and Barbuda | 91% | 5% | – | – | 4% |
| Bahamas | 96% | – | – | – | 4% |
| Barbados | 96% | – | 1% | – | 3% |
| Belize | 25% | – | 15% | 55% | 5% |
| Bermuda (United Kingdom) | 61% | – | 4% | – | 31% |
| British Virgin Islands (United Kingdom) | 81% | 7% | – | 5% | 7% |
| Canada | 5% | – | 20% | 3% | 70% |
| Cayman Islands (United Kingdom) | 40% | 41% | – | – | 19% |
| Dominica | 88% | 11% | – | – | 1% |
| Grenada | 82% | 18% | – | – | – |
| Guyana | 31% | 22% | 42% | – | 5% |
| Jamaica | 92% | 7% | 1% | – | – |
| Saint Kitts and Nevis | 92% | 5% | 1% | – | 2% |
| Saint Lucia | 87% | 11% | 2% | – | – |
| Saint Vincent and the Grenadines | 69% | 21% | 6% | – | 4% |
| Trinidad and Tobago | 37% | 24% | 38% | – | 1% |
| Turks and Caicos Islands (United Kingdom) | 92% | – | – | – | 8% |
| United States | 15% | – | 5% | 20% | 60% |
| United States Virgin Islands (United States) | 73% | 7% | 1% | 18% | 1% |

== Economy ==
People from other parts of the world have immigrated to Anglo-America in search of a better quality of life, better employment, and an escape from famine, poverty, violence, and conflict. People from many different ethnic origins in Latin America and more remote places all over the world, including the less English-dominant parts of Oceania, continental Europe, Asia, and Africa, all live in Anglo-America contemporarily.

Standard of living
| Country | GDP (PPP) in billions (USD) | Per capita PPP (USD) | Year |
|---|---|---|---|
| Anguilla (United Kingdom) | 0.31 billion | 29,493 | 2014 |
| Antigua and Barbuda | 2.375 billion | 25,336 | 2022 |
| Bahamas | 16.554 billion | 40,378 | 2022 |
| Barbados | 5.023 billion | 17,837 | 2022 |
| Belize | 4.640 billion | 11,450 | 2022 |
| Bermuda (United Kingdom) | 6.088 billion | 95,837 | 2022 |
| British Virgin Islands (United Kingdom) | 0.5 billion | 34,200 | 2017 |
| Canada | 2,273.4 billion | 58,399 | 2022 |
| Cayman Islands (United Kingdom) | 5.217 billion | 76,850 | 2022 |
| Dominica | 0.98 billion | 13,573 | 2022 |
| Grenada | 2.13 billion | 16,987 | 2022 |
| Guyana | 32.868 billion | 40,641 | 2022 |
| Jamaica | 33.424 billion | 11,821 | 2022 |
| Saint Kitts and Nevis | 1.622 billion | 34,051 | 2022 |
| Saint Lucia | 3.193 billion | 17,756 | 2022 |
| Saint Vincent and the Grenadines | 1.788 billion | 17,206 | 2022 |
| Trinidad and Tobago | 42.529 billion | 27,778 | 2022 |
| Turks and Caicos Islands (United Kingdom) | 1.047 billion | 22,914 | 2022 |
| United States | 25,462.7 billion | 76,398 | 2022 |
| United States Virgin Islands (United States) | 4.068 billion | 38,136 | 2019 |

== See also ==
General

- Anglo
- English Americans
- Americas (terminology)
- Americas
- North American English
- North America
- Northern America
- Central America
- South American English
- South America
- Caribbean English
- Caribbean
- Anglophone Caribbean
- Commonwealth Caribbean
- British America
- British diaspora in Africa
- British North America
- White Anglo-Saxon Protestant

Anglosphere

- Anglosphere
- English-speaking world

Languages

- French America
- Spanish America
- Hispanic America
- Ibero-America
- Latin America
- Portuguese America

Lists

- List of North American countries by GDP (nominal)
- List of North American countries by GDP per capita
- List of North American countries by GDP (PPP)
- List of South American countries by GDP per capita
- List of South American countries by GDP (PPP)
