= Economy of North America =

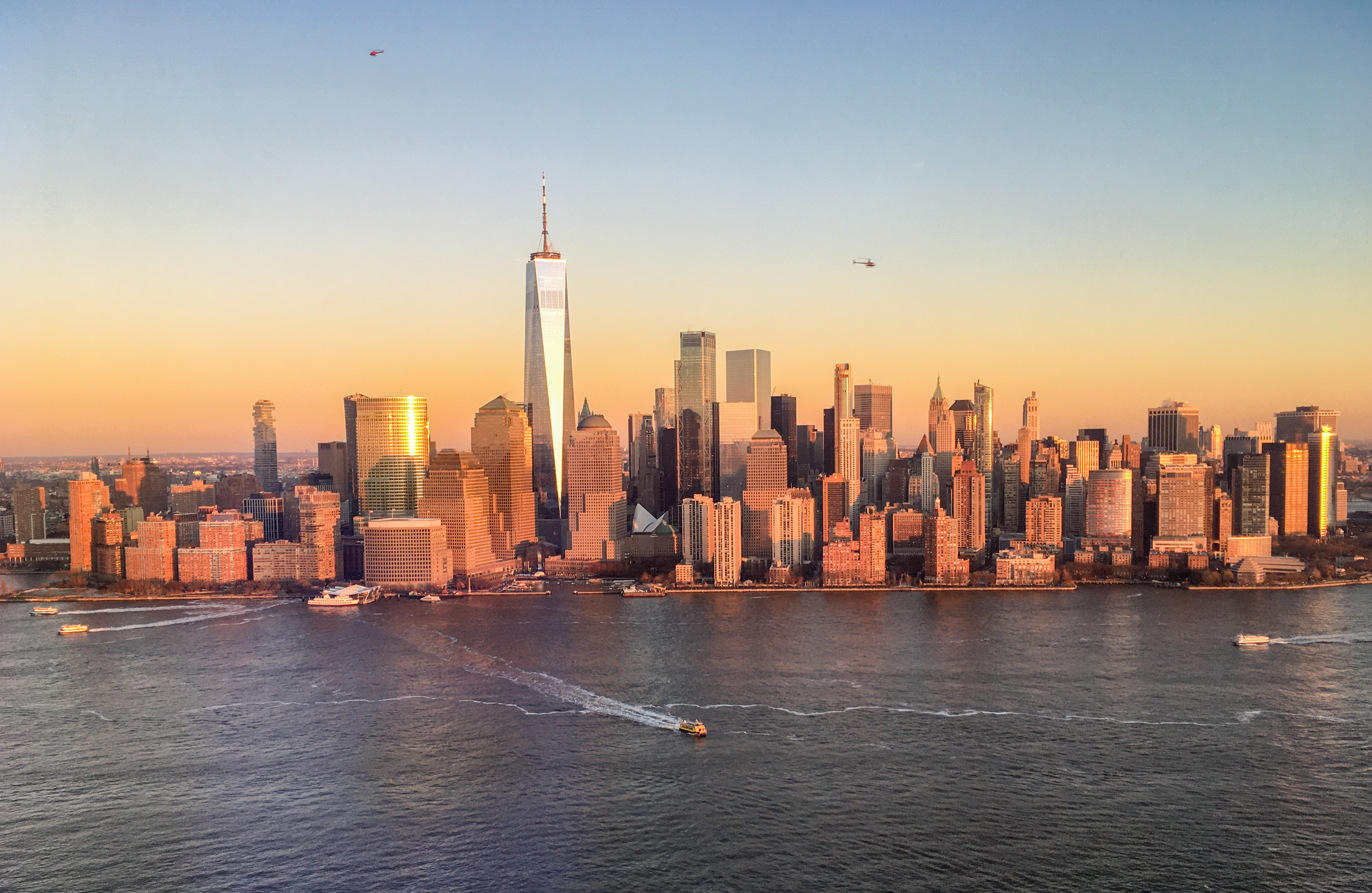
- The New York metropolitan area has the largest gross metropolitan product in the North America.

Statistics
- Population: ▲596 million (2021)
- GDP: ▲$30.11 trillion (nominal; 2023f); ▲$31.74 trillion (PPP; 2023f)
- GDP rank: 2nd (nominal; 2023); 3rd (PPP; 2023)
- GDP growth: ▲1% (2023f)
- GDP per capita: ▲$59,330 (nominal; 2023f); ▲$62,540 (PPP; 2023f)
- GDP per capita rank: 2nd (nominal; 2023); 2nd (PPP; 2023)
- Inflation (CPI): ▼3.8% (2023)
- Millionaires (US$): 26.8 million (2022)

Public finance
- Government debt: ▲117.4% of GDP (2023)
- Most numbers are from the International Monetary Fund. IMF North America Datasets All values, unless otherwise stated, are in US dollars.

The continent of North America has a diverse set of economies at various stages of development. It comprises more than 596 million people (8% of the world population) in its 24 sovereign states and 15 dependent territories. It is marked by a sharp division between the predominantly English speaking countries of Canada and the United States, which are among the wealthiest and most developed nations in the world, and countries of Central America and the Caribbean in the former Latin America that are less developed. Mexico and the Caribbean nations of the Commonwealth of Nations are between the economic extremes of the development of North America.

Mexico lies in between these two extremes as a newly industrialized country (NIC), and is a part of the North American Free Trade Agreement (NAFTA) and a member of the Organisation for Economic Co-operation and Development (OECD), being one of the only two Latin American members of this organisation (together with Chile). The United States is by far the largest economy in North America and the largest national economy in the world. The U.S., Canada and Mexico have significant and multifaceted economic systems.

== Economic development ==
=== Great Depression ===
The Great Depression began in North America in October 1929. The start is often dated to the stock market collapse of Black Tuesday although this was not the cause of the Great Depression. Canada and the United States experienced especially large declines, with the gross domestic product falling 37% from 1929 to 1933 in the United States, and 43% in Canada over the same period. The economy reached its lowest point in 1933, however recovery was slow. The outbreak of World War II in 1939 created demand for war materials that brought about the end of the depression.

The Great Depression spurred increased government intervention in the economy in North America. The United States introduced unemployment insurance, a minimum wage and standardised working hours under the New Deal. Canada introduced similar measures. Mexico nationalised some key industries during the Great Depression, with the railroads nationalised by 1937 and the oil industry nationalised in 1938.

=== World War II ===
Due to the large scale enlistment of men into armed forces during World War II, women entered the workforce en masse, filling many jobs in manufacturing and technical areas that had previously been closed to women. This led to the "We can do it!" campaign. The economic output in North America increased substantially, with unemployment practically eliminated in the United States. Rationing severely reduced the availability of consumer goods, with the increase in industrial production coming from the demand for war materials. During the peak of World War II activity, nearly 40 per cent of US GDP was devoted to war production.

=== Cold War ===
After the 2nd world war, the United States and Russia emerged as the world superpowers with both economies being strong and thus each country wanted to be recognised as a superpower. The relationship between the two countries further deteriorated with the space race.

=== US-Canada Free Trade Agreement and NAFTA - a new era of economic integration ===
The Canada-United States Free Trade Agreement of 1989 and the subsequent expansion to the North American Free Trade Agreement (NAFTA) triggered a dramatic increase in trade between these three countries, with Mexican trade with the United States and Canada increasing threefold. Over 85% of Canadian exports in 2006 went to the United States.

== Regional variation ==
With various climate zones, agricultural products vary from country to country. Job sectors are also different, with industrialized countries having more service workers, and developing countries relying on agriculture.

== Trade blocs ==
=== Asia-Pacific Economic Cooperation ===
The Asia-Pacific Economic Cooperation (APEC) is a group of Pacific Rim countries which meet with the purpose of improving economic and political ties. APEC's stated goals are aimed at free and open trade and investments by cutting tariffs between zero and five percent in the Asia-Pacific area for industrialised economies by 2010 and for developing economies by 2020.

The organisation has members from four continents, those from North America are Canada, Mexico and the United States.

=== Caribbean Community ===
The Caribbean Community (CARICOM) was created "To provide dynamic leadership and service, in partnership with Community institutions and Groups, toward the attainment of a viable, internationally competitive and sustainable Community, with improved quality of life for all". Its secretariat is based in Georgetown, Guyana, South America.

- On January 1, 2006, six members: (Barbados, Belize, Guyana, Jamaica, Suriname and Trinidad and Tobago) unofficially ushered in the Caribbean (CARICOM) Single Market and Economy (CSME).

- At the official signing of the protocol on January 30, 2006, in Jamaica, A further six members: (Antigua and Barbuda, Dominica, Grenada, Saint Kitts and Nevis, Saint Lucia and Saint Vincent and the Grenadines) announced their intention to join by the second quarter of 2006. Montserrat, a British Overseas territory, is awaiting approval by the United Kingdom. Haiti and the Bahamas have no immediate plans to join.

=== Central American Free Trade Agreement ===
The Central American Free Trade Agreement (CAFTA) is an agreement between the United States and the Central American countries of Costa Rica, Guatemala, El Salvador, Honduras, and Nicaragua. The treaty is aimed at promoting free trade between its members. Canada and Mexico are negotiating membership.

=== North American Free Trade Agreement ===
The North American Free Trade Agreement (NAFTA) is an agreement between Canada, Mexico and the United States to eliminate tariffs on goods traded between themselves.

Although currently only a trade agreement, with no supranational bodies or laws as in the European Union, there have been various proposals to move towards a customs union or a North American currency union. It is unknown whether this may eventually develop into a North American Union similar to that of Europe.

== Currency ==
Country	Currency	Central bank
Antigua and Barbuda	EC dollar	Eastern Caribbean Central Bank
Bahamas	Bahamian dollar	Central Bank of the Bahamas
Barbados	Barbadian dollar	Central Bank of Barbados
Belize	Belizean dollar	Central Bank of Belize
Canada	Canadian dollar	Bank of Canada
Costa Rica	Colón	Central Bank of Costa Rica
Cuba	Cuban convertible peso	Central Bank of Cuba
Cuba	Cuban peso	Central Bank of Cuba
Dominica	EC dollar	Eastern Caribbean Central Bank
Dominican Republic	Dominican Republic Peso	Central Bank of the Dominican Republic
El Salvador	US dollar	Central Reserve Bank of El Salvador
Greenland	Danish krone	Danmarks Nationalbank
Grenada	EC dollar	Eastern Caribbean Central Bank
Guatemala	Quetzal	Bank of Guatemala
Haiti	Gourde	Central Bank of Haiti
Honduras	Lempira	Central Bank of Honduras
Jamaica	Jamaican dollar	Bank of Jamaica
Mexico	Mexican peso	Bank of Mexico
Nicaragua	Córdoba	Central Bank of Nicaragua
Panama	Balboa	National Bank of Panama
Saint Kitts and Nevis	EC dollar	Eastern Caribbean Central Bank
Saint Lucia	EC dollar	Eastern Caribbean Central Bank
Saint Vincent and the Grenadines	EC dollar	Eastern Caribbean Central Bank
Trinidad and Tobago	Trinidad and Tobago dollar	Central Bank of Trinidad and Tobago
United States	US dollar	Federal Reserve System

== Economic sectors ==
=== Agriculture ===
Agriculture is very important in Central American and Caribbean nations. In western Canada, in the provinces of Saskatchewan, Alberta, British Columbia and Manitoba, wheat and other various main agricultural products are grown. The U.S. also has many states with significant agriculture production, mainly in the central continental U.S. Mexico produces many tropical fruits and vegetables as well as edible animals. In America, according to the USDA as of 2023 the most produced crop which is corn and is the highest planted crop here with it rising the past 30 years, with Iowa and Illinois contributing to 1/3 of the crop produced. Corn being the major crop produced contributes to 75.8 billion dollars as a cash crop. In Mexico as of 2023 one of the main fruits sold is avocadoes and the most profitable as well bringing in 2.84 billion dollars to Mexico with 75 percent being grown in the state of Michoacan and has continued to grow in revenue as well as yearly. In Canada canola created 43.7 billion in revenue for them as one of their highest selling crops, along with wheat bringing in 42.8 billion as well being a major contributor to Canadas agriculture as well.

=== Manufacturing ===
North America has developed and its manufacturing sector has grown. In the beginning the European nations were the large manufacturing powers. At the start of the 1950s, the United States was a top manufacturing power, with Canada and Mexico also making significant progress.

=== Service ===
In Canada, the US and the Caribbean, service-based employment is a significant percentage of overall employment. Many people work in stores and other retail locations. In Canada more than 70% work in the services sector, with a similar percentage in the United States.

=== Investment and banking ===
The United States leads North America in investment and banking. Canada, Mexico and most recently, February 2011, El Salvador is growing in this sector. And smaller economic powers such as Guatemala, Honduras, Costa Rica, and Panama are also growing slowly in this sector.

=== Tourism ===
Tourism is extremely important for the Caribbean economies, as they contain many beaches and have warm climates. Skiing in Canada and the US is also important. Tourism of national parks and natural landmarks, such as Mount Rushmore and the Grand Canyon in the United States, and Niagara Falls and Moraine lake in Canada, contribute to the economy in these regions.

==== Walt Disney World ====
The most tourist visited location in North America is Walt Disney World in Orlando, Florida. It is the most visited vacation resort globally, attracting over 58 million visitors annually. Walt Disney World generates approximately 6 billion dollars annually in tax revenue for the state of Florida and created 263,000 jobs.

==== Niagara Falls ====
Canada's most visited location is Niagara Falls on the border between Ontario, Canada, and New York, US with approximately 12 million visitors each year. Niagara Falls generates approximately $8.6 million in taxes and provides about 50,000 jobs.

==== Cancún and Chichén Itzá ====
The most visited location in Mexico is Cancún, located on Mexico's Yucatán Peninsula, it attracts over 21 million tourists annually. Mexico's tourist attractions create $29 million tax dollars and 2.5 million jobs for its citizens.

== See also ==
- North America
- North American Industry Classification System

Statistics:

- List of North American countries by GDP (PPP)
- List of North American countries by GDP (nominal)
- List of North American countries by GDP per capita
