= List of sovereign states and dependent territories in North America =

The following is a list of sovereign countries and dependent territories in North America, a continent that covers the landmass north of the Colombia-Panama border as well as the islands of the Caribbean.

== Sovereign states ==
All of the states listed here are member states of the United Nations.

| Flag | Map | English short, formal names, and ISO | Domestic short and formal name(s) | Capital | Population 2021 | Area | Currency |
|---|---|---|---|---|---|---|---|
| Flag of Antigua and Barbuda | ATG orthographic | Antigua and Barbuda (Note: Note that this country is a member of the Caribbean Community. The Caribbean Community also includes Guyana and Suriname.) ATG | English: Antigua and Barbuda | St. John's | 93,219 | 442.6 km^{2} (171 sq mi) | East Caribbean dollar |
| Flag of the Bahamas | The Bahamas on the globe (Americas centered) | The Bahamas Commonwealth of The Bahamas BHS | English: The Bahamas—Commonwealth of The Bahamas | Nassau | 407,906 | 13,940 km^{2} (5,382 sq mi) | Bahamian dollar |
| Flag of Barbados | BRB orthographic | Barbados BRB | English: Barbados | Bridgetown | 281,200 | 431 km^{2} (166 sq mi) | Barbadian dollar |
| Flag of Belize | BLZ orthographic | Belize (Note: Member of the Central American Integration System.) BLZ | English: Belize | Belmopan | 400,031 | 22,966 km^{2} (8,867 sq mi) | Belize dollar |
| Flag of Canada | Canada (orthographic projection) | Canada (Note: Member of the United States–Mexico–Canada Agreement.) CAN | English: Canada French: Canada | Ottawa | 38,155,012 | 9,984,670 km^{2} (3,855,103 sq mi) | Canadian dollar |
| Flag of Costa Rica | Costa Rica (orthographic projection) | Costa Rica Republic of Costa Rica CRI | Spanish: Costa Rica — República de Costa Rica | San José | 5,153,957 | 51,180 km^{2} (19,761 sq mi) | Costa Rican colón |
| Flag of Cuba | Cuba (orthographic projection) | Cuba Republic of Cuba CUB | Spanish: Cuba — República de Cuba | Havana | 11,256,372 | 110,860 km^{2} (42,803 sq mi) | Cuban peso Cuban convertible peso |
| Flag of Dominica | Dominica on the globe (Americas centered) | Dominica Commonwealth of Dominica DMA | English: Dominica — Commonwealth of Dominica | Roseau | 72,412 | 754 km^{2} (291 sq mi) | East Caribbean dollar |
| Flag of the Dominican Republic | Dominican Republic (orthographic projection) | Dominican Republic DOM | English: Dominican Republic Spanish: República Dominicana | Santo Domingo | 11,117,873 | 48,730 km^{2} (18,815 sq mi) | Dominican peso |
| Flag of El Salvador | El Salvador (orthographic projection) | El Salvador Republic of El Salvador SLV | English: El Salvador — Republic of El Salvador Spanish: El Salvador — República de El Salvador | San Salvador | 6,314,167 | 21,040 km^{2} (8,124 sq mi) | United States dollar |
| Flag of Grenada | Grenada on the globe (Americas centered) | Grenada GRD | English: Grenada | St. George's | 124,610 | 344 km^{2} (133 sq mi) | East Caribbean dollar |
| Flag of Guatemala | Guatemala (orthographic projection) | Guatemala Republic of Guatemala GTM | Spanish: Guatemala — República de Guatemala | Guatemala City | 17,608,483 | 108,890 km^{2} (42,043 sq mi) | Guatemalan quetzal |
| Flag of Haiti | Haiti (orthographic projection) | Haiti Republic of Haiti HTI | French: Haïti — République d'Haïti Haitian Creole: Ayiti — Repiblik d Ayiti | Port-au-Prince | 11,447,569 | 27,750 km^{2} (10,714 sq mi) | Haitian gourde |
| Flag of Honduras | Honduras (orthographic projection) | Honduras Republic of Honduras HND | Spanish: Honduras — República de Honduras | Tegucigalpa | 10,278,345 | 112,090 km^{2} (43,278 sq mi) | Honduran lempira |
| Jamaica | Jamaica (orthographic projection) | Jamaica JAM | English: Jamaica | Kingston | 2,827,695 | 10,991 km^{2} (4,244 sq mi) | Jamaican dollar |
| Flag of Mexico | Mexico (orthographic projection) | Mexico United Mexican States MEX | Spanish: México — Estados Unidos Mexicanos | Mexico City | 126,705,138 | 1,972,550 km^{2} (761,606 sq mi) | Mexican peso |
| Flag of Nicaragua | Nicaragua (orthographic projection) | Nicaragua Republic of Nicaragua NIC | Spanish: Nicaragua — República de Nicaragua | Managua | 6,850,540 | 129,494 km^{2} (49,998 sq mi) | Nicaraguan córdoba |
| Flag of Panama | Panama (orthographic projection) | Panama Republic of Panama PAN | English: Panama — Republic of Panama Spanish: Panamá — República de Panamá | Panama City | 4,351,267 | 78,200 km^{2} (30,193 sq mi) | Panamanian balboa United States dollar |
| Flag of Saint Kitts and Nevis | KNA orthographic | Saint Kitts and Nevis Federation of Saint Kitts and Nevis KNA | English: Saint Kitts and Nevis — Federation of Saint Kitts and Nevis | Basseterre | 47,606 | 261 km^{2} (101 sq mi) | East Caribbean dollar |
| Flag of Saint Lucia | Saint Lucia on the globe (Americas centered) | Saint Lucia LCA | English: Saint Lucia | Castries | 179,651 | 616 km^{2} (238 sq mi) | East Caribbean dollar |
| Flag of Saint Vincent and the Grenadines | VCT orthographic | Saint Vincent and the Grenadines VCT | English: Saint Vincent and the Grenadines | Kingstown | 104,332 | 389 km^{2} (150 sq mi) | East Caribbean dollar |
| Flag of Trinidad and Tobago | Trinidad and Tobago (orthographic projection) | Trinidad and Tobago Republic of Trinidad and Tobago TTO | English: Trinidad and Tobago — Republic of Trinidad and Tobago | Port of Spain | 1,525,663 | 5,128 km^{2} (1,980 sq mi) | Trinidad and Tobago dollar |
| Flag of the United States | United States (orthographic projection) | United States United States of America USA | English: United States of America | Washington, D.C | 336,997,624 | 9,826,630 km^{2} (3,794,083 sq mi) | United States dollar |

== Non-sovereign territories ==
This section contains areas that are not sovereign states nor integral parts of the sovereign states listed above. These include dependent territories and integral areas of primarily non-North American states.

=== Dependent territories ===
Dependencies that are not internationally recognized, or not in effect, are listed in italics.

| Flag | English short, formal names, and ISO | Domestic short name(s) | Capital | Population 2021 | Area | Currency | Sovereign state | Legal status |
|---|---|---|---|---|---|---|---|---|
| Flag of Anguilla | Anguilla AIA | English: Anguilla | The Valley | 15,753 | 102 km^{2} (39 sq mi) | East Caribbean dollar | United Kingdom | British Overseas Territory |
| Flag of Bermuda | Bermuda BMU | English: Bermuda Portuguese: Bermudas | Hamilton | 64,185 | 53.3 km^{2} (21 sq mi) | Bermudian dollar | United Kingdom | British Overseas Territory |
| Flag of the British Virgin Islands | British Virgin Islands Virgin Islands VGB | English: Virgin Islands | Road Town | 31,122 | 153 km^{2} (59 sq mi) | United States dollar | United Kingdom | British Overseas Territory |
| Flag of the Cayman Islands | Cayman Islands CYM | English: Cayman Islands | George Town | 68,136 | 262 km^{2} (101 sq mi) | Cayman Islands dollar | United Kingdom | British Overseas Territory |
| Flag of Montserrat | Montserrat MSR | English: Montserrat | Plymouth (de jure — abandoned); Brades (de facto — seat of government) | 4,417 | 102 km^{2} (39 sq mi) | East Caribbean dollar | United Kingdom | British Overseas Territory |
| N/A | Navassa Island (Note: Claimed by Haiti.) UM-76 | English: Navassa Island | Lulu Town (de jure — abandoned) | 0 | 5.4 km^{2} (2 sq mi) | United States dollar | United States | Uninhabited, administrated by the United States as an unincorporated unorganized territory, claimed by Haiti |
| Flag of Puerto Rico | Puerto Rico Commonwealth of Puerto Rico PRI | Spanish: Puerto Rico — Estado Libre Asociado de Puerto Rico English: Puerto Rico — Commonwealth of Puerto Rico | San Juan | 3,256,028 | 13,790 km^{2} (5,324 sq mi) | United States dollar | United States | Unincorporated organized territory and Commonwealth of the United States |
| Flag of the Turks and Caicos Islands | Turks and Caicos Islands TCA | English: Turks and Caicos Islands | Cockburn Town | 45,114 | 430 km^{2} (166 sq mi) | United States dollar | United Kingdom | British Overseas Territory |
| Flag of the United States Virgin Islands | United States Virgin Islands Virgin Islands of the United States VIR | English: United States Virgin Islands — Virgin Islands of the United States | Charlotte Amalie | 100,091 | 1,910 km^{2} (737 sq mi) | United States dollar | United States | Unincorporated organized territory of the United States |

=== Integral parts of primarily non-North American states ===
| Flag | English short, formal names, and ISO | Domestic short name(s) | Capital | Population 2021 | Area | Currency | Sovereign state | Legal status |
|---|---|---|---|---|---|---|---|---|
| Flag of Aruba | Aruba Country of Aruba ABW | Dutch: Aruba — Land Aruba Papiamento: Aruba — Pais Aruba | Oranjestad | 106,537 | 193 km^{2} (75 sq mi) | Aruban florin | Netherlands | Constituent country of the Kingdom of the Netherlands |
| Flag of Bonaire | Bonaire (Note: Municipality of the Netherlands.) BES | Dutch: Bonaire Papiamento: Boneiru | Kralendijk | 20,104 | 179 km^{2} (69 sq mi) | United States dollar | Netherlands | Special municipality of the Netherlands |
| Flag of France | Clipperton Island CPT | French: Île de Clipperton | N/A | 0 | 6 km^{2} (2 sq mi) | N/A | France | Uninhabited overseas state private property of France |
| Flag of Curaçao | Curaçao Country of Curaçao CUW | Dutch: Curaçao — Land Curaçao Papiamento: Kòrsou — Pais Kòrsou | Willemstad | 190,338 | 276 km^{2} (107 sq mi) | Caribbean guilder | Netherlands | Constituent country of the Kingdom of the Netherlands |
| Flag of Federal Dependencies of Venezuela | Federal Dependencies VE-W | Spanish: Dependencias Federales de Venezuela | Gran Roque | 2,155 | 342 km^{2} (132 sq mi) | Bolívar soberano, Petro | Venezuela | Federal Dependencies of Venezuela |
| Flag of Greenland | Greenland GRL | Greenlandic: Kalaallit Nunaat Danish: Grønland | Nuuk | 56,243 | 2,166,086 km^{2} (836,330 sq mi) | Danish krone | Denmark | Autonomous Territory In the Kingdom of Denmark |
| Unofficial flag of Guadeloupe | Guadeloupe (Note: Department of France.) GLP | French: Guadeloupe Guadeloupean Creole French: Gwadloup | Basse-Terre | 396,051 | 1,628 km^{2} (629 sq mi) | Euro | France | Overseas department and region of France |
| Unofficial flag of Martinique | Martinique Territorial Collectivity of Martinique MTQ | French: Martinique — Collectivité Territoriale de Martinique | Fort-de-France | 368,796 | 1,128 km^{2} (436 sq mi) | Euro | France | Overseas department and region of France |
| Flag of Saba | Saba BES | Dutch: Saba English: Saba | The Bottom | 1,933 | 13 km^{2} (5 sq mi) | United States dollar | Netherlands | Special municipality of the Netherlands |
| Flag of France | Saint Barthélemy Territorial Collectivity of Saint Barthélemy BLM | French: Saint-Barthélemy — Collectivité de Saint-Barthélemy | Gustavia | 10,861 | 25 km^{2} (10 sq mi) | Euro | France | Overseas collectivity of France |
| Flag of France | Saint Martin Collectivity of Saint Martin MAF | French: Saint-Martin — Collectivité de Saint-Martin | Marigot | 31,948 | 53.2 km^{2} (21 sq mi) | Euro | France | Overseas collectivity of France |
| Flag of France | Saint Pierre and Miquelon Overseas Collectivity of Saint Pierre and Miquelon SPM | French: Saint-Pierre-et-Miquelon — Collectivité d'outre-mer de Saint-Pierre-et-Miquelon | Saint Pierre | 5,883 | 242 km^{2} (93 sq mi) | Euro | France | Overseas collectivity of France |
| Flag of San Andrés y Providencia | San Andrés and Providencia (Note: Part of Colombia.) Archipelago of San Andrés, Providencia and Santa Catalina CO-SAP | Spanish: San Andrés y Providencia — Archipiélago de San Andrés, Providencia y Santa Catalina | San Andrés | 61,280 | 52.5 km^{2} (20 sq mi) | Colombian peso | Colombia | Department of Colombia |
| Flag of Sint Eustatius | Sint Eustatius BES | Dutch: Sint Eustatius English: Statia | Oranjestad | 3,138 | 21 km^{2} (8 sq mi) | United States dollar | Netherlands | Special municipality of the Netherlands |
| Flag of Sint Maarten | Sint Maarten SXM | Dutch: Sint Maarten | Philipsburg | 44,042 | 41.44 km^{2} (16 sq mi) | Caribbean guilder | Netherlands | Constituent country of the Kingdom of the Netherlands |

=== Disputed territories ===
Disputed territories that are not internationally recognized, or not in effect, are listed in italics:

| Flag | English short name | English long name | Domestic short name(s) | Claimants | Legal status |
|---|---|---|---|---|---|
| N/A | Bajo Nuevo Bank (Note: Certain U.S. government documents list these as unorganized, unincorporated territories of the United States. For the most part, however, they are under Colombian administration as an integral part of Colombia, part of the San Andrés and Providencia Department. They are also claimed by Jamaica, and in part by Honduras.) | Bajo Nuevo Bank | Spanish: Bajo Nuevo | Colombia; Jamaica; United States | Uninhabited, administered by Colombia, claimed by the United States as an unincorporated unorganized territory. Also claimed by Jamaica. |
| N/A | Serranilla Bank | Serranilla Bank | Spanish: Bajo Serranilla | Colombia; United States | Uninhabited, administered by Colombia, claimed by the United States as an unincorporated unorganized territory. |

== See also ==
- Flags of North America
- List of currencies in the Americas
- List of North American countries by GDP (nominal)
- List of North American countries by GDP (nominal) per capita
- List of North American countries by GDP (PPP)
- List of North American countries by GDP (PPP) per capita
- List of predecessors of sovereign states in North America
- List of sovereign states and dependent territories in South America
- List of sovereign states and dependent territories in the Americas
