= List of North American countries by GDP =

List of North American countries by GDP may refer to:

- List of North American countries by GDP (nominal)
- List of North American countries by GDP (PPP)
