= List of North American countries by GDP per capita =

List of North American countries by GDP per capita may refer to:

- List of North American countries by GDP (PPP) per capita
- List of North American countries by GDP (nominal) per capita
