= List of South American countries by GDP (nominal) per capita =

This is a list of South American countries by GDP (nominal) per capita for the latest year. The estimates are based on data from the World Economic Outlook, which is released biannually by the International Monetary Fund.

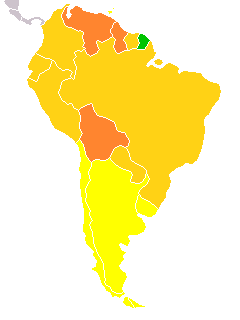
Map of South American countries by GDP (nominal) per capita according to the International Monetary Fund for 2018 >$60,000 $50,000 - $60,000 $40,000 - $50,000 $30,000 - $40,000 $20,000 - $30,000 $10,000 - $20,000 $5,000 - $10,000 $2,500 - $5,000 $1,000 - $2,500 <$1,000

Region rank	World rank (Note: World rank does not compare with countries that don't have a 2024 estimate, namely Afghanistan, Eritrea and Syria.)	Country	2024 GDP (nominal) per capita US Dollars
1	42	Guyana	30,962
2	54	Uruguay	23,089
3	66	Chile	16,439
4	73	Argentina	13,415
5	83	Brazil	10,214
6	90	Peru	8,485
7	93	Colombia	7,943
8	103	Suriname	6,889
9	104	Ecuador	6,775
10	108	Paraguay	6,388
11	125	Venezuela	4,511
12	133	Bolivia	3,939

== See also ==
- List of South American countries by GDP (PPP) per capita
