= List of sovereign states and dependent territories in the Americas =

This is an alphabetical list of sovereign states and dependent territories in the Americas. It comprises three regions, Northern America (Canada and the United States), the Caribbean (cultural region of the English, French, Dutch, and Creole speaking countries located on the Caribbean Sea) and Latin America (nations that speak Spanish and Portuguese). The Americas are almost entirely located in the Western Hemisphere, with some of the north-west islands of Alaska entering the Eastern Hemisphere. The majority of islands lying in the Atlantic between the Americas and Afro-Eurasia, such as Iceland, are not normally associated with the Americas and are therefore excluded from this list.

== Sovereign states ==
The following is a list of sovereign states in the Americas. All 35 states are members of the United Nations and the Organization of American States.

Flag	English short name	English long name	Capital	Local long name(s)	Year of independence	ISO 3-letter Alpha Code
Flag of Antigua and Barbuda	Antigua and Barbuda	Antigua and Barbuda	St. John's	English: Antigua and Barbuda	1981	ATG
Flag of Argentina	Argentina	Argentine Republic	Buenos Aires	Spanish: República Argentina	1816	ARG
Flag of the Bahamas	Bahamas	Commonwealth of The Bahamas	Nassau	English: Commonwealth of The Bahamas	1973	BHS
Flag of Barbados	Barbados	Barbados	Bridgetown	English: Barbados	1966	BRB
Flag of Belize	Belize	Belize	Belmopan	English: Belize; Spanish: Belice	1981	BLZ
Flag of Bolivia	Bolivia	Plurinational State of Bolivia	La Paz and Sucre^{[B]}	Spanish: Estado Plurinacional de Bolivia; Quechua: Buliwya Mamallaqta; Aymara: Wuliwya Suyu; Guarani: Tetã Volívia	1825	BOL
Flag of Brazil	Brazil	Federative Republic of Brazil	Brasília	Portuguese: República Federativa do Brasil	1822	BRA
Flag of Canada	Canada	Canada	Ottawa	English: Canada; French: Canada	1867	CAN
Flag of Chile	Chile	Republic of Chile	Santiago^{[C]}	Spanish: República de Chile	1818	CHL
Flag of Colombia	Colombia	Republic of Colombia	Bogotá	Spanish: República de Colombia	1810	COL
Flag of Costa Rica	Costa Rica	Republic of Costa Rica	San José	Spanish: República de Costa Rica	1821	CRI
Flag of Cuba	Cuba	Republic of Cuba	Havana	Spanish: República de Cuba	1902	CUB
Flag of Dominica	Dominica	Commonwealth of Dominica	Roseau	English: Commonwealth of Dominica	1978	DMA
Flag of the Dominican Republic	Dominican Republic	Dominican Republic	Santo Domingo	Spanish: República Dominicana	1844	DOM
Flag of Ecuador	Ecuador	Republic of Ecuador	Quito	Spanish: República del Ecuador	1822	ECU
Flag of El Salvador	El Salvador	Republic of El Salvador	San Salvador	Spanish: República de El Salvador	1821	SLV
Flag of Grenada	Grenada	Grenada	St. George's	English: Grenada	1974	GRD
Flag of Guatemala	Guatemala	Republic of Guatemala	Guatemala City	Spanish: República de Guatemala	1821	GTM
Flag of Guyana	Guyana	Co-operative Republic of Guyana	Georgetown	English: Co-operative Republic of Guyana	1966	GUY
Flag of Haiti	Haiti	Republic of Haiti	Port-au-Prince	French: République d'Haïti	1804	HTI
Flag of Honduras	Honduras	Republic of Honduras	Tegucigalpa	Spanish: República de Honduras	1821	HND
Flag of Jamaica	Jamaica	Jamaica	Kingston	English: Jamaica	1962	JAM
Flag of Mexico	Mexico	United Mexican States	Mexico City	Spanish: Estados Unidos Mexicanos	1821	MEX
Flag of Nicaragua	Nicaragua	Republic of Nicaragua	Managua	Spanish: República de Nicaragua	1821	NIC
Flag of Panama	Panama	Republic of Panama	Panama City	Spanish: República de Panamá	1903	PAN
Flag of Paraguay	Paraguay	Republic of Paraguay	Asunción	Spanish: República del Paraguay; Guarani: Tetã Paraguái	1811	PRY
Flag of Peru	Peru	Republic of Peru	Lima	Spanish: República del Perú; Quechua: Piruw Republika; Aymara: Piruw Suyu	1821	PER
Flag of Saint Kitts and Nevis	Saint Kitts and Nevis	Federation of Saint Kitts and Nevis	Basseterre	English: Federation of Saint Kitts and Nevis	1983	KNA
Flag of Saint Lucia	Saint Lucia	Saint Lucia	Castries	English: Saint Lucia	1979	LCA
Flag of Saint Vincent and the Grenadines	Saint Vincent and the Grenadines	Saint Vincent and the Grenadines	Kingstown	English: Saint Vincent and the Grenadines	1979	VCT
Flag of Suriname	Suriname	Republic of Suriname	Paramaribo	Dutch: Republiek Suriname	1975	SUR
Flag of Trinidad and Tobago	Trinidad and Tobago	Republic of Trinidad and Tobago	Port of Spain	English: Republic of Trinidad and Tobago	1962	TTO
Flag of the United States	United States	United States of America	Washington, D.C.	English: United States of America	1776	USA
Flag of Uruguay	Uruguay	Oriental Republic of Uruguay	Montevideo	Spanish: República Oriental del Uruguay	1828	URY
Flag of Venezuela	Venezuela	Bolivarian Republic of Venezuela	Caracas	Spanish: República Bolivariana de Venezuela	1811	VEN

== Constituent parts of sovereign states ==
Flag	English short name	English long name	Political status	Capital	Local short name(s)
Aruba	Aruba	Aruba	Constituent country of the Kingdom of the Netherlands	Oranjestad	Dutch: Aruba
Bonaire	Bonaire	Bonaire	Special municipality of the country of the Netherlands	Kralendijk	Dutch: Bonaire Papiamento: Boneiru
France	Clipperton Island	Clipperton Island	Overseas state private property and constituent part of the French Republic	Uninhabited	French: Île de Clipperton
Curaçao	Curaçao	Curaçao	Constituent country of the Kingdom of the Netherlands	Willemstad	Dutch: Curaçao Papiamento: Kòrsou
French Guiana	French Guiana	French Guiana	Overseas region and constituent part of the French Republic	Cayenne	French: Guyane
Greenland	Greenland	Greenland	Autonomous territory of the Kingdom of Denmark	Nuuk	Greenlandic: Kalaallit Nunaat Danish: Grønland
Guadeloupe	Guadeloupe	Guadeloupe	Overseas region and constituent part of the French Republic	Basse-Terre	French: Guadeloupe
Martinique	Martinique	Martinique	Overseas region and constituent part of the French Republic	Fort-de-France	French: Martinique
Saba (island)	Saba	Saba	Special municipality of the country of the Netherlands	The Bottom	Dutch: Saba
Saint Barthélemy	Saint Barthelemy	Collectivity of Saint Barthelemy	Overseas collectivity and constituent part of the French Republic	Gustavia	French: Saint-Barthélemy
France	Saint Martin	Collectivity of Saint Martin	Overseas collectivity and constituent part of the French Republic	Marigot	French: Saint-Martin
Saint Pierre and Miquelon	Saint Pierre and Miquelon	Territorial Collectivity of Saint Pierre and Miquelon	Overseas collectivity and constituent part of the French Republic	Saint-Pierre	French: Saint-Pierre-et-Miquelon
Sint Eustatius	Sint Eustatius	Sint Eustatius	Special municipality of the country of the Netherlands	Oranjestad	Dutch: Sint Eustatius
Sint Maarten	Sint Maarten	Sint Maarten	Constituent country of the Kingdom of the Netherlands	Philipsburg	Dutch: Sint Maarten

== Dependent territories of sovereign states ==
Flag	English short name	English long name	Political status	Capital	Local short name(s)
Anguilla	Anguilla	Anguilla	British overseas territory	The Valley	English: Anguilla
Bermuda	Bermuda	Bermuda Islands	British overseas territory	Hamilton	English: Bermuda; Spanish: Bermudas; Portuguese: Bermudas
British Virgin Islands	British Virgin Islands	British Virgin Islands	British overseas territory	Road Town	English: British Virgin Islands
Cayman Islands	Cayman Islands	Cayman Islands	British overseas territory	George Town	English: Cayman Islands
Falkland Islands	Falkland Islands	Falkland Islands	British overseas territory	Stanley	English: Falkland Islands; Spanish: Islas Malvinas
Montserrat	Montserrat	Montserrat	British overseas territory	Brades (de facto); Plymouth (de jure)	English: Montserrat
Navassa Island	Navassa Island	Navassa Island	Unincorporated unorganized territory of the United States	Uninhabited	English: Navassa Island
Puerto Rico	Puerto Rico	Commonwealth of Puerto Rico	Unincorporated organized territory of the United States	San Juan	Spanish: Puerto Rico; English: Puerto Rico
South Georgia and the South Sandwich Islands	South Georgia and the South Sandwich Islands	South Georgia and the South Sandwich Islands	British overseas territory	King Edward Point	English: South Georgia and the South Sandwich Islands; Spanish: Islas Georgia del Sur y las Islas Sandwich del Sur
Turks and Caicos Islands	Turks and Caicos Islands	Turks and Caicos Islands	British overseas territory	Grand Turk (Cockburn Town)	English: Turks and Caicos Islands
United States Virgin Islands	U.S. Virgin Islands	United States Virgin Islands	Unincorporated organized territory of the United States	Charlotte Amalie	English: United States Virgin Islands

== See also ==
- List of countries in the Americas by population
- List of sovereign states
- List of sovereign states and dependent territories in North America
- List of sovereign states and dependent territories in South America
- List of former sovereign states § North America and List of former sovereign states § South America
