= List of countries in the Americas by population =

Pan-American countries by population, 2020

This is a list of countries and dependent territories in the Americas by population, which is sorted by the 2015 mid-year normalized demographic projections.

== Table ==
Below is the list of Pan-American countries by population.

| Rank | Country (or dependent territory) | Population (2023) | % of pop. (2022) | Average relative annual growth (%) (2022) | Average absolute annual growth (2015) | Date of last figure | Source |
|---|---|---|---|---|---|---|---|
| 1 | United States | 339,979,847 | 32.41 | 0.75 | 2,377,000 | March 24, 2023 | Official population clock |
| 2 | Brazil | 217,637,297 | 20.82 | 0.86 | 1,750,000 | September 20, 2026 | Official population clock |
| 3 | Mexico | 130,000,000 | 12.32 | 1.08 | 1,293,000 | March 2, 2020 | Official estimate |
| 4 | Colombia | 52,049,498 | 4.99 | 1.16 | 555,000 | June 25, 2021 | Official population clock |
| 5 | Argentina | 46,208,747 | 4.48 | 1.09 | 463,000 | July 1, 2021 | Official estimate |
| 6 | Canada | 38,395,507 | 3.75 | 0.79 | 279,000 | March 24, 2021 | Official estimate |
| 7 | Peru | 34,035,304 | 3.23 | 1.10 | 338,000 | July 1, 2021 | Official estimate |
| 8 | Venezuela | 28,705,000 | 2.80 | 1.37 | 414,000 | July 1, 2021 | Official estimate |
| 9 | Chile | 19,678,363 | 1.92 | 1.05 | 187,000 | June 30, 2021 | Official estimate |
| 10 | Ecuador | 18,697,380 | 1.73 | 1.57 | 252,000 | September 20, 2026 | Official population clock |
| 11 | Guatemala | 17,109,746 | 1.67 | 2.93 | 461,000 | July 1, 2021 | Official estimate |
| 12 | Haiti | 11,743,017 | 1.14 | 1.73 | 179,000 | July 1, 2020 | Official estimate |
| 13 | Bolivia | 11,312,620 | 1.15 | 0.25 | 28,000 | August 29, 2024 | Official estimate |
| 14 | Cuba | 11,193,470 | 1.09 | 2.31 | 248,000 | December 31, 2019 | Official estimate |
| 15 | Dominican Republic | 10,535,535 | 1.03 | 0.98 | 97,000 | July 1, 2021 | Official estimate |
| 16 | Honduras | 10,200,000 | 0.92 | 2.29 | 200,000 | July 1, 2021 | Official estimate |
| 17 | Paraguay | 7,353,038 | 0.71 | 1.58 | 109,000 | | Official estimate |
| 18 | El Salvador | 6,825,935 | 0.66 | 2.37 | 151,000 | June 30, 2012 | Official estimate |
| 19 | Nicaragua | 6,527,691 | 0.63 | 0.92 | 59,000 | 2016 | Official estimate |
| 20 | Costa Rica | 5,163,038 | 0.50 | 1.63 | 78,000 | June 30, 2015 | Official estimate |
| 21 | Panama | 4,278,500 | 0.41 | 1.37 | 51,000 | May 22, 2018 | Official estimate |
| 22 | Uruguay | 3,554,915 | 0.34 | -1.13 | -40,000 | July 1, 2014 | Official estimate |
| 23 | Jamaica | 2,900,000 | 0.26 | 0.26 | 7,000 | December 31, 2014 | Official estimate |
| - | Puerto Rico (US) | 2,700,000 | 0.31 | 0.18 | 6,000 | June 30, 2016 | Official estimate |
| 24 | Trinidad and Tobago | 1,366,725 | 0.13 | 0.52 | 7,000 | 2015 | Official estimate |
| 25 | Guyana | 743,699 | 0.07 | 0.00 | 0 | September 15, 2012 | Final 2012 census result |
| 26 | Suriname | 590,100 | 0.05 | 1.08 | 6,000 | August 13, 2012 | Final 2012 census result |
| 27 | Belize | 419,199 | 0.04 | 0.25 | 1,000 | January 1, 2017 | Official estimate |
| - | Guadeloupe (France) | 405,000 | 0.03 | -0.52 | -2,000 | January 1, 2017 | Official estimate |
| 28 | Bahamas | 393,450 | 0.03 | 2.50 | 9,000 | | |
| - | Martinique (France) | 383,000 | 0.03 | 1.34 | 5,000 | 2015 | Official estimate |
| 29 | Barbados | 288,000 | 0.02 | 0.35 | 1,000 | May 1, 2010 | 2010 census result |
| - | French Guiana (France) | 262,000 | 0.02 | 2.75 | 7,000 | January 1, 2017 | Official estimate |
| 30 | Saint Lucia | 178,696 | 0.01 | 0.58 | 1,000 | May 10, 2010 | Preliminary 2010 census result |
| - | Curaçao (Kingdom of the Netherlands) | 156,223 | 0.01 | 0.64 | 1,000 | January 1, 2014 | Official estimate |
| 31 | Grenada | 113,000 | 0.01 | 1.85 | 2,000 | 2015 | Official estimate |
| - | Aruba (Kingdom of the Netherlands) | 111,904 | 0.01 | 0.00 | 0 | 2014 | Official estimate |
| 32 | Saint Vincent and the Grenadines | 110,696 | 0.01 | 0.00 | 0 | April 1, 2010 | 2010 census result |
| - | United States Virgin Islands (US) | 104,000 | 0.01 | 0.00 | 0 | May 12, 2011 | Final 2011 census result |
| 33 | Antigua and Barbuda | 99,337 | 0.00 | 1.14 | 1,000 | May 27, 2011 | Final 2011 census result |
| 34 | Dominica | 72,000 | 0.00 | 0.00 | 0 | May 14, 2011 | Preliminary 2011 census result |
| - | Cayman Islands (UK) | 64,958 | 0.00 | 0.00 | 0 | May 20, 2010 | Final 2010 census result |
| - | Bermuda (UK) | 64,055 | 0.00 | 3.51 | 2,000 | December 31, 2014 | Official estimate |
| - | Greenland (Denmark) | 56,421 | 0.00 | 0.00 | 0 | July 1, 2015 | Official estimate |
| 35 | Saint Kitts and Nevis | 54,000 | 0.00 | 0.00 | 0 | May 15, 2011 | 2011 census result |
| - | Turks and Caicos Islands (UK) | 42,953 | 0.00 | 2.63 | 1,000 | February 1, 2014 | Official estimate |
| - | Sint Maarten (Kingdom of the Netherlands) | 40,614 | 0.00 | 5.71 | 2,000 | January 25, 2012 | Preliminary 2012 census result |
| - | Saint Martin (France) | 34,065 | 0.00 | 0.00 | 0 | January 1, 2017 | Official estimate |
| - | British Virgin Islands (UK) | 30,000 | 0.00 | 3.33 | 1,000 | July 12, 2010 | 2010 census result |
| - | Caribbean Netherlands (Kingdom of the Netherlands) | 25,157 | 0.00 | 4.00 | 1,000 | January 1, 2015 | Official estimate |
| - | Anguilla (UK) | 15,000 | 0.00 | 0.00 | 0 | May 11, 2011 | Final 2011 census result |
| - | Saint Barthélemy (France) | 10,124 | 0.00 | 0.00 | 0 | January 1, 2017 | Official estimate |
| - | Saint Pierre and Miquelon (France) | 5,985 | 0.00 | 0.00 | 0 | January 1, 2017 | Official estimate |
| - | Montserrat (UK) | 5,000 | 0.00 | 0.00 | 0 | May 12, 2011 | 2011 census result |
| - | Falkland Islands (UK) | 3,398 | 0.00 | 0.00 | 0 | April 15, 2012 | Final 2012 census result |
| - | South Georgia and the South Sandwich Islands (UK) | 20 | 0.00 | 0.00 | 0 | January 1, 2018 | Final 2012 census result |
| | Total | 1,022,380,830 | 100.00 | 0.99 | 9,588,000 | | |

== See also ==
- List of countries in the Americas by life expectancy
