= List of South American countries by GDP (PPP) per capita =

The page contains lists of South American nations by gross domestic product per capita based on purchasing power parity from multiple sources.

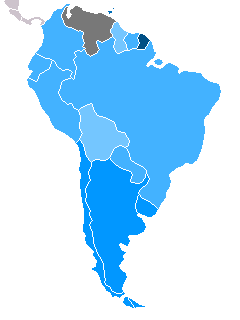
South American countries by GDP PPP per capita according to the International Monetary Fund for 2018 >$50,000 $40,000 - $50,000 $30,000 - $40,000 $20,000 - $30,000 $10,000 - $20,000 $5,000 - $10,000 $2,000 - $5,000 <$2,000

== IMF list ==
South American country rankings according to the International Monetary Fund for 2026, denominated in international dollars.

Rank	Country	GDP (PPP) per capita Int'l dollars	Year
1	Guyana	95,477	2026
2	Uruguay	39,030	2026
3	Chile	37,336	2026
4	Argentina	33,187	2026
5	Brazil	24,428	2026
6	Colombia	23,576	2026
7	Paraguay	23,349	2026
8	Suriname	22,985	2026
9	Peru	20,116	2026
10	Ecuador	17,720	2026
11	Bolivia	12,692	2026
12	Venezuela	9,461	2025

== CIA World Factbook list ==
Country ranking for 2023 according to The World Factbook by the Central Intelligence Agency, denominated in US Dollars.

Region Rank	World Rank	Country	GDP (PPP) per capita US dollars	Year
1	43	Guyana	49,300	2023 est.
2	77	Uruguay	31,000	2023 est.
3	80	Chile	29,500	2023 est.
4	85	Argentina	27,100	2023 est.
5	103	Suriname	19,000	2023 est.
6	104	Brazil	19,000	2023 est.
7	107	Colombia	18,700	2023 est.
8	119	Paraguay	15,800	2023 est.
9	123	Peru	15,300	2023 est.
10	125	Ecuador	14,500	2023 est.
11	149	Bolivia	9,800	2023 est.
12	156	Venezuela	7,704	2018 est.

== World Bank list ==
Country rankings for 2023 according to the World Bank, denominated in international dollars.

Rank	Country	GDP (PPP) per capita Int'l dollars	Year
1	Guyana	54,732	2023
2	Uruguay	34,427	2023
3	Chile	32,893	2023
4	Argentina	30,082	2023
5	Suriname	21,136	2023
6	Brazil	21,107	2023
7	Colombia	20,676	2023
8	Paraguay	17,517	2023
9	Peru	16,974	2023
10	Ecuador	16,062	2023
11	Bolivia	10,925	2023
12	Venezuela	n/a	-

== See also ==
- List of countries by GDP (PPP) per capita
- List of South American countries by GDP (nominal) per capita
