= List of North American countries by GDP (nominal) per capita =

This is a list of North American nations ranked by Gross Domestic Product (GDP) per capita in nominal terms, which are calculated at market or government official exchange rates. The figures provided are 2019 estimates from the IMF

Region Rank	Country	GDP (nominal) per capita US-Dollar
1	United States	70,000
2	Canada	47,764
3	The Bahamas	32,661
4	Aruba	24,371
5	Barbados	17,758
6	Saint Kitts and Nevis	17,397
7	Antigua and Barbuda	16,702
8	Trinidad and Tobago	16,638
9	Panama	15,089
10	Costa Rica	11,729
11	Grenada	10,405
12	Saint Lucia	9,606
13	Mexico	9,319
14	Dominica	7,879
15	Cuba (2015)	7,602
16	Dominican Republic	7,478
17	Saint Vincent and the Grenadines	7,124
18	Jamaica	5,193
19	Belize	4,806
20	Guatemala	4,469
21	El Salvador	3,895
22	Honduras	2,766
23	Nicaragua	2,221
24	Haiti	784

== See also ==
- List of North American countries by GDP (PPP) per capita
- Economic growth
- Economic reports
