= List of South American countries and dependencies by GDP (PPP) =

This is a list of South American nations ranked by Gross Domestic Product (GDP) at Purchasing Power Parity (PPP) for the latest years recorded in the CIA World Factbook. The figures provided are quoted in US dollars and are 2017 estimates unless otherwise noted.

Region Rank	World Rank	Country	2017 GDP (PPP) billions of USD
—	—	South America	6,541,9
1	9	Brazil	3,219
2	29	Argentina	911.5
3	32	Colombia	712.5
4	45	Chile	452.1
5	47	Peru	424.6
6	48	Venezuela	389.4
7	67	Ecuador	188.5
8	93	Bolivia	83.5
9	96	Uruguay	78.4
10	103	Paraguay	68
11	165	Suriname	7.9
12	173	Guyana	6.3
-	217	(Falkland Islands) Falklands Islands	0.218

Dependent territory - United Kingdom

== See also ==
- Economy of South America
- Economic growth
- Economic reports
- List of countries by GDP (PPP)
