= List of North American countries by GDP (nominal) =

The United States is the largest economy in North America, comprising around 85 percent of the continent's gross domestic product.
1. United States (85.35%)
2. Canada (6.68%)
3. Mexico (5.58%)
4. Other (2.39%)

Gross domestic product (GDP) is the market value of all final goods and services from a nation in a given year. Countries in North America are sorted by nominal GDP estimates based on 2024 data from the World Economic Outlook by the International Monetary Fund.

== List ==
| Region rank | World rank (Note: World rank does not compare with countries that don't have a 2024 estimate, namely Afghanistan, Eritrea and Syria.) | Country | 2024 GDP (nominal) millions of US Dollars |
|---|---|---|---|
| — | — | North America | 34,004,774 |
| 1 | 1 | United States | 29,184,900 |
| 2 | 9 | Canada | 2,241,253 |
| 3 | 13 | Mexico | 1,852,723 |
| 4 | 63 | Dominican Republic | 124,613 |
| 5 | 70 | Guatemala | 112,575 |
| - | - | Cuba | 107,352 (2020) |
| 6 | 74 | Costa Rica | 95,365 |
| 7 | 78 | Panama | 87,688 |
| 8 | 103 | Honduras | 36,965 |
| 9 | 105 | El Salvador | 35,337 |
| 10 | 116 | Haiti | 26,229 |
| 11 | 119 | Trinidad and Tobago | 25,524 |
| 12 | 128 | Jamaica | 20,069 |
| 13 | 130 | Nicaragua | 19,710 |
| 14 | 142 | The Bahamas | 14,761 |
| 15 | 154 | Barbados | 7,167 |
| 16 | 165 | Belize | 3,427 |
| 17 | 170 | Saint Lucia | 2,523 |
| 18 | 172 | Antigua and Barbuda | 2,225 |
| 19 | 179 | Grenada | 1,392 |
| 20 | 181 | Saint Vincent and the Grenadines | 1,162 |
| 21 | 182 | Saint Kitts and Nevis | 1,117 |
| 22 | 185 | Dominica | 697 |

== See also ==
- Economic growth
- Economic reports
- List of North American countries by GDP (PPP)
