= List of North American countries by GDP (PPP) per capita =

This is a list of North American nations by GDP per capita. All figures are based on the gross domestic product (at purchasing power parity) per capita, i.e., the purchasing power parity (PPP) value of all final goods and services produced within a country in a given year, divided by the average (or mid-year) population for the same year. The figures given are in international dollars and rounded to the nearest hundred. Names of dependent territories (not sovereign states) are in italics and are not ranked.

North American Rank	World Rank	Country	GDP (PPP) per capita	Year
—	—	Bermuda (UK)	85,700	2013 est.
—	—	Sint Maarten (NL)	66,800	2014 est.
1	13	United States	59,500	2017 est.
2	25	Canada	48,100	2017 est.
—	—	Cayman Islands (UK)	43,800	2004 est.
—	—	Puerto Rico (US)	37,900	2017 est.
—	—	Greenland (DK)	37,000	2011 est.
—	—	United States Virgin Islands (US)	36,100	2013 est.
—	—	Saint Pierre and Miquelon (FR)	34,900	2006 est.
—	—	British Virgin Islands (UK)	34,200	2017 est.
3	45	Trinidad and Tobago	31,200	2017 est.
—	—	Turks and Caicos Islands (UK)	29,100	2007 est.
4	54	Saint Kitts and Nevis	26,800	2017 est.
5	56	Antigua and Barbuda	26,300	2017 est.
—	—	Aruba (NL)	25,300	2007 est.
6	58	Bahamas	25,100	2017 est.
7	60	Panama	24,300	2017 est.
8	68	Mexico	19,500	2017 est.
—	—	Saint Martin (FR)	19,300	2005 est.
9	76	Barbados	17,500	2017 est.
10	79	Costa Rica	17,200	2017 est.
11	81	Dominican Republic	17,000	2017 est.
—	—	Curaçao (NL)	15,000	2004 est.
12	88	Grenada	14,700	2017 est.
13	91	Saint Lucia	13,500	2017 est.
—	—	Anguilla (UK)	12,200	2008 est.
14	103	Dominica	12,000	2017 est.
15	105	Cuba	11,900	2016 est.
16	106	Saint Vincent and the Grenadines	11,600	2017 est.
17	115	Jamaica	9,200	2017 est.
18	117	El Salvador	8,900	2017 est.
—	—	Montserrat (UK)	8,500	2006 est.
19	122	Belize	8,300	2017 est.
20	123	Guatemala	8,200	2017 est.
21	136	Nicaragua	5,800	2017 est.
22	140	Honduras	5,500	2017 est.
23	183	Haiti	1,880	2017 est.

== See also ==
- List of countries by GDP (PPP) per capita
- List of North American countries by GDP PPP
- North American Free Trade Agreement (NAFTA)
- CARICOM
