= List of North American countries by GDP (PPP) =

The United States is the largest economy in North America, comprising about 80% of the continent's gross domestic product (PPP).
1. United States (80.1%)
2. Mexico (9.2%)
3. Canada (7%)
4. Other (3.70%)

This is a list of North American nations ranked by Gross Domestic Product (GDP) at Purchasing Power Parity (PPP). Countries are sorted by their 2024 GDP (PPP) estimates based on data from the World Economic Outlook, which is released biannually by the International Monetary Fund.

== List ==
Region Rank	World Rank (Note: World rank does not compare with countries that don't have a 2024 estimate, namely Afghanistan, Eritrea and Syria.)	Country	2024 GDP (PPP) millions of Int'l dollars
—	—	North America	36,548,225
1	2	United States	29,184,900
2	13	Mexico	3,316,680
3	16	Canada	2,623,362
4	64	Dominican Republic	314,729
5	71	Guatemala	264,663
6	80	Panama	187,472
7	88	Costa Rica	159,180
8	-	Cuba	103,130 (Note: 2019 World Bank estimate)
9	106	El Salvador	83,917
10	107	Honduras	81,083
11	121	Nicaragua	60,231
12	134	Trinidad and Tobago	49,181
13	142	Haiti	37,586
14	146	Jamaica	33,084
15	153	The Bahamas	15,332
16	167	Barbados	6,416
17	168	Belize	6,297
18	172	Aruba	5,265
19	173	Saint Lucia	4,950
20	176	Antigua and Barbuda	3,151
21	178	Grenada	2,362
22	179	Saint Vincent and the Grenadines	2,204
23	181	Saint Kitts and Nevis	1,673
24	184	Dominica	1,377

== See also ==
- Economic growth
- Economic reports
- List of North American countries by GDP (nominal)
