= List of predecessors of sovereign states in South America =

This is a list of all present sovereign states in South America and their predecessors. The division between North and South America is unclear, generally viewed as lying somewhere in the Isthmus of Panama, however, the whole of Panama is considered to be part of North America as its southernmost nation. The continent was colonized by the Europeans: First by the Spaniards, and the Portuguese; and later by the Dutch, the French, and the English. Most of the present-day nations gained independence in the early 19th century, all of Latin America except for two Spanish colonies in North America gained independence between 1808 and 1826. Today, South America consists of twelve sovereign states with common government system being some form of presidential republic.

Sovereign state	Predecessors
Argentina	Quilmes Civilisation (850–1667) Viceroyalty of Peru (1542–1776) (viceroyalty of the Crown of Castile); Viceroyalty of the Río de la Plata (1776–1810) (viceroyalty of the Spanish Empire); United Provinces of the Río de la Plata (1810–1831); Argentine Confederation (1831–1861); Argentine Republic (1861–present)
Bolivia	Wankarani culture (c. 1500 BC – c. 400 AD); Tiwanaku Empire (c. 600 – c. 1000); Aymara kingdoms (c. 1150 – c. 1477); Governorate of New Toledo (1528–1542); Viceroyalty of Peru (1542–1776) (viceroyalty of the Crown of Castile); Viceroyalty of the Río de la Plata (1776–1810) (viceroyalty of the Spanish Empire); Viceroyalty of Peru (1810–1825) (viceroyalty of the Spanish Empire); State of Upper Peru (1825); Republic of Bolívar (1825); Republic of Bolivia (1825–2009); Plurinational State of Bolivia (2009–present)
Brazil	Marajoara Culture (400–1300?) Kuhikugu Civilization (500–1600?) Colonial Brazil (1500–1815) (colony of Portugal); United Kingdom of Portugal, Brazil and the Algarves (1815–1822); Empire of Brazil (1822–1889); Republic of the United States of Brazil (1889–1937); United States of Brazil (1937–1967); Federative Republic of Brazil (1967–present)
Chile	Captaincy General of Chile (1542–1818); Republic of Chile (1818–present) Easter Island; Kingdom of Rapa Nui (400?–1902)
Colombia	Herrera Period (1500 BC–800); Quimbaya (500 BC–1600); San Agustín (400 BC–1600); Tumaco-La Tolita (350 BC–400); Calima (200 BC–1600); Zenú (200 BC–1600); Tairona (100 BC–1600); Capulí (800–1600); Muisca Confederation (800–1540); Province of Tierra Firme (1498–1542) Viceroyalty of Peru (1542–1776) (viceroyalty of the Crown of Castile); Viceroyalty of New Granada (1717–1819); Gran Colombia (1819–1831); State of New Granada (1831–1832); Republic of New Granada (1832–1858); Granadine Confederation (1858–1863); United States of Colombia (1863–1886); Republic of Colombia (1886–present)
Ecuador	Cañari (6th century – 1533) Governorate of New Toledo (1528–1542); Viceroyalty of Peru (1542–1776) (viceroyalty of the Crown of Castile); Viceroyalty of New Granada (1717–1822); Gran Colombia (1822–1830); State of Ecuador (1830–1835); Republic of Ecuador (1835–present)
Guyana	Colony of Essequibo (1616–1815), Berbice (1627–1815) and Colony of Demerara (1745–1815) (all Dutch colonies); French Guyana (1795–1814); British Guiana (1814–1966); Guyana (1966–1970); Co-operative Republic of Guyana (1970–present)
Panama	Governorate of New Toledo (1528–1542); Viceroyalty of Peru (1542–1776) (viceroyalty of the Crown of Castile); Viceroyalty of New Granada (1717–1819); Gran Colombia (1819–1831); State of New Granada (1831-1832); Republic of New Granada (1832–1858); Granadine Confederation (1858–1863); United States of Colombia (1863–1886); Republic of Colombia (1886–1903); Republic of Panama (1903–present)
Paraguay	Viceroyalty of the Río de la Plata (1776–1814); Republic of Paraguay (1814–present)
Peru	Caral–Supe civilization (c. 3500 – c. 1800 BC) Casma–Sechin Civilisation (c. 3500 – c. 200 BC) Jisk'a Iru Muqu (c. 3400 – c. 1600 BC) Kotosh Civilisation (c. 1800 – c. 900 BC) Chiripa culture (c. 1400 – c. 100 BC) Pucará (c. 1400 BC – c. 400 AD) Chachapoya (c. 900 – c. 1470 AD) Chavín culture (c. 900 – c. 250 BC) Paracas culture (c. 800 – c. 100 BC) Nazca culture (c. 100 BC – c. 800 AD) Lima culture (c. 100 – c. 650 AD) Moche culture (c. 100 – c. 700 AD) Tiwanaku Empire (c. 600 – c. 1000 AD) Wari Empire (6th century – 11th century) Kingdom of Chimor (c. 900 – c. 1470) Chincha culture (c. 900 – c. 1480) Ichma Kingdom (c. 1100 – c. 1469) Kingdom of Cusco (c. 1197 – c. 1438) Inca Empire (1438–1533) Governorate of New Castile (1528–1542) and Governorate of New Toledo (1528–1542) (both Spanish colonies); Viceroyalty of Peru (1542–1824); Republic of Peru (1824–present)
Suriname	Colony of Surinam (1630–1954); Country of Suriname (1954–1975) (constituent country of the Netherlands); French Suriname (1795–1814) Republic of Suriname (1975–present)
Trinidad and Tobago	Viceroyalty of New Granada (1717–1797); French Trinidad and Tobago (1717–1797) British West Indies (1797–1962); Trinidad and Tobago (1962–1976) (commonwealth realm); Republic of Trinidad and Tobago (1976–present)
Uruguay	United Provinces of the River Plate (1810–1816); United Kingdom of Portugal, Brazil and the Algarves (1816–1822); Empire of Brazil (1822–1828); Eastern State of Uruguay (1828–1918); Eastern Republic of Uruguay (1818–present)
Venezuela	Viceroyalty of New Spain (1521–1717); Viceroyalty of New Granada (1717–1777); Captaincy General of Venezuela (1777–1821); First Republic of Venezuela (1811–1812); Second Republic of Venezuela (1813–1814); Third Republic of Venezuela (1817–1819); Gran Colombia (1821–1830); State of Venezuela (1830–1857); Republic of Venezuela (1858–1864); United States of Venezuela (1864–1953); Republic of Venezuela (1953–1999); Bolivarian Republic of Venezuela (1999–present)

== See also ==
- List of sovereign states and dependent territories in South America
- Succession of states
- Decolonization of the Americas
