= Decolonization of the Americas =

The decolonization of the Americas occurred over several centuries as most of the countries in the Americas gained their independence from European rule. The American Revolution was the first in the Americas, and the British defeat in the American Revolutionary War (1775–83) was a victory against a great power, aided by France and Spain, Britain's enemies. The French Revolution in Europe followed, and collectively these events had profound effects on the Spanish, Portuguese, and French colonies in the Americas. A revolutionary wave followed, resulting in the creation of several independent countries in Latin America. The Haitian Revolution (1791–1804), perhaps one of the most successful slave uprisings in history, resulted in the independence of the French slave colony of Saint-Domingue (now Haiti). The Peninsular War with France, which resulted from the Napoleonic occupation of Spain led to a power vacuum on the throne of Spain. The Spanish liberal revolution resulting from a power vacuum on the throne directly led to democratization in Spanish America, and caused Spanish Creoles to question their allegiance to Spain, stoking independence movements that culminated in various Spanish American wars of independence (1808–33), which were primarily fought between opposing groups of colonists and only secondarily against Spanish forces. At the same time, the Portuguese monarchy fled to Brazil during the French invasion of Portugal. After the royal court returned to Lisbon, the prince regent, Pedro, remained in Brazil and in 1822 successfully declared himself emperor of a newly independent Empire of Brazil.

Spain would lose all three of its remaining Caribbean colonies by the end of the 1800s. Santo Domingo declared its first independence from Spain in 1821. The independent state was renamed Republic of Spanish Haiti. Haiti conquered the region shortly afterwards in 1822. Two decades later, in 1844, independence was proclaimed for the second time, and the Dominican Republic was established. This triggered the Dominican War of Independence (1844–56). In 1861, however, Spain regained control of the territory, and the colony was reestablished. The Dominican Restoration War (1863–65), the second war of liberation, led to the second independence from Spain, and the Dominican Republic's third and final independence. Cuba fought for independence from Spain in the Ten Years' War (1868–78) and Little War (1879–80) and finally the Cuban War of Independence (1895–98). American intervention in 1898 became the Spanish–American War and resulted in the United States gaining Puerto Rico, Guam (which are still U.S. territories), and the Philippine Islands in the Pacific Ocean. Under military occupation, Cuba became a U.S. protectorate until its independence in 1902.

Peaceful independence by the voluntary withdrawal of colonial powers then became the norm in the second half of the 20th century. However, there are still British and Dutch colonies in North America (mostly Caribbean islands). France has fully integrated most of its former colonies in the Americas (French Guiana, Guadeloupe, and Martinique) as fully constituent Departments of France.

== Conditions before revolution ==
=== Undermining of metropolitan authority ===
During the 18th century, Spain recovered much of the strength it had lost in the 17th century but the country's resources were under strain because of the incessant warfare in Europe from 1793. This led to increased local participation in the financing of defense and increased participation in militias by the locally born. Such development was at odds with the ideals of the centralized absolute monarchy. The Spanish also made formal concessions to strengthen defense; In Chiloé, Spanish authorities promised freedom from the Encomienda for Indigenous locals who settled near the new stronghold of Ancud (founded in 1768) and contributed to its defense. The increased local organization of the defenses would ultimately undermine the metropolitan authority and bolster the independence movement.

=== Napoleonic Wars ===
The Napoleonic Wars were a series of wars fought between France (led by Napoleon Bonaparte) and alliances involving Britain, Prussia, Spain, Portugal, Russia, and Austria at different times, from 1799 to 1815.

In the case of Spain and its colonies, in May 1808, Napoleon captured Carlos IV and King Fernando VII and installed his brother, Joseph Bonaparte, as Spanish monarch. This event disrupted the political stability of Spain and broke the link with some of the colonies which were loyal to the Bourbon Dynasty. The local elites, the creoles, took matters into their own hands organizing themselves into juntas to take "in absence of the king, Fernando VII, their sovereignty devolved temporarily back to the community". The juntas swore loyalty to the captive Fernando VII and each ruled different and diverse parts of the colony. Most of Fernando's subjects were loyal to him in 1808, but after he was restored to the Spanish crown in 1814, his policy of restoring absolute power alienated both the juntas and his subjects. He abrogated the Cádiz Constitution of 1812 and punished those who had supported it. The violence used by royalist forces and the prospect of being ruled by Fernando shifted the majority of the colonist population in favor of separation from Spain. The local elites reacted to absolutism in much the same way that the British colonial elites, Tory and Whig alike, had reacted to London's interference before 1775.

=== Spanish military presence in its colonies ===
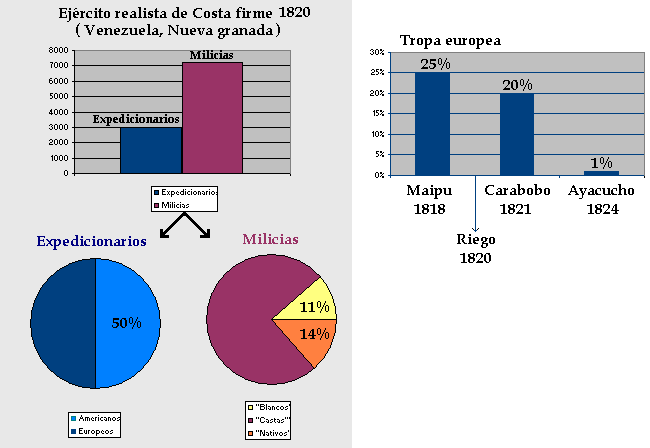
Graphs showing the make-up of the royalist army at the time of the revolution.

The Bourbon army in Spanish America had the mission of defending the territory against hostile foreign powers. It consisted overwhelmingly of militias and, to a lesser extent, some veteran units. The militias, which included some veteran troops, were known as "disciplined militias." The few reinforcement expeditions from the Iberian Peninsula were intended to strengthen the veteran or garrison units (fortress garrisons). As a result, about 80% of the army was made up of local troops and officers, tied to the local elite. During the independence period, this colonial army split according to whether local elites supported the patriots or the royalists.

The royalist army, a supporter of Ferdinand VII of Spain, was an improvised organization and not the colonial army of the Spanish Empire; it had neither the same mission nor the same organization as that army had in the viceregal period. Nevertheless, it too was drawn from a broad cross-section of viceregal society, and Americans made up the majority of the forces on all fronts. Over the course of the conflict, the few expeditionary troops were replaced, as they suffered casualties, by American troops. In the final chapter of the war, which began with the Riego revolution of 1820, no more Spanish soldiers were sent to the wars in the Americas. In 1820 there were 3,500 expeditionary troops in New Spain, 2,000 in the Royal Army in Colombia and Venezuela, and 1,500 in Peru. Overall, Spaniards made up only 10% of all royalist armies, and only half of the soldiers in the expeditionary units were European. At the Battle of Ayacucho (1824), only 500 soldiers of the royalist army were Iberian, a number similar to the number of Europeans on the patriot side.

=== Other factors ===
The Enlightenment spurred the desire for social and economic reform to spread throughout the Americas and the Iberian Peninsula. Ideas about free trade and physiocratic economics were raised by the Enlightenment.

Independence movements in South America can be traced back to slave revolts in plantations in the northernmost part of the continent and the Caribbean. In 1791, a massive slave revolt sparked a general insurrection against the plantation system and French colonial power. These events were followed by a violent uprising led by José Leonardo Chirino and José Caridad González that sprung up in 1795 Venezuela, allegedly inspired by the revolution in Haiti.

Toussaint L'Ouverture was born a slave in Saint-Domingue where he developed labor skills that would give him higher privileges than other slaves. He intellectually and physically advanced resulting in promotion, land of his own, and owning slaves. In 1791, slaves in Haiti formed a revolution to seek independence from their French owners. L'Ouverture joined the rebellion as a top military official to abolish slavery without complete independence. However, through a series of letters written by Toussaint, it became clear that he grew open to equal human rights for all that live in Haiti. Similar to how the United States Constitution was ratified, the enlightenment ideas of equality and representation of the people created an impact of change against the status quo that sparked the revolution. The letter details the great concerns he felt due to a conservative shift in France's legislature after the revolution in 1797. The greatest fear was that these conservative values could give ideas to the French Government to bring back slavery. The enlightenment has proven to forever change the way a captive society thinks after L'Ouverture refuses to let the French send him and his people back into slavery. "[W]hen finally the rule of law took the place of anarchy under which the unfortunate colony had too long suffered, what fatality can have led the greatest enemy of its prosperity and our happiness still to dare to threaten us with the return of slavery?" Ultimately, slavery was abolished from French colonies in 1794 and Haiti declared Independence from France in 1804.

== United States ==
The United States of America declared independence from Great Britain on July 4, 1776, thus becoming the first independent, foreign-recognized nation in the Americas and the first European colonial entity to break from its mother country. Britain formally acknowledged American independence in 1783 after its defeat in the American Revolutionary War. The U.S. victory encouraged independence movements in other parts of the Americas.

Although initially occupying only the land east of the Mississippi between Canada and Florida, the United States would later eventually acquire various other North American territories, through war with Mexico, and the annexation of Texas, and from the British, French, Spanish, and Russians in succeeding years under the mantle of Manifest Destiny. While ending European control over the region, these events resulted in the expansion of settler colonialism against Native nations, especially following the discovery of gold in regions such as the Dakotas and California, as well as opportunities for American settlers to claim farmland in the Great Plains. Land speculators and individual settlers both played a significant role in the expansion of America into what was then termed Indian Territory. American encroachment on Indigenous nations prompted the creation of several federations opposed to Manifest Destiny such as the Northwestern confederacy and Tecumseh's Confederacy.

== Haiti and the French Antilles ==
The American and French Revolutions had profound effects on Spanish, Portuguese and French colonies in the Americas. Haiti, a French slave colony, was the first to follow the United States to independence, during the Haitian Revolution, which lasted from 1791 to 1804. Thwarted in his attempt to rebuild a French empire in North America, Napoleon Bonaparte sold Louisiana to the United States and from then on focused on the European theater, marking the end of France's ambitions of building a colonial empire in the Western Hemisphere.

== Spanish America ==
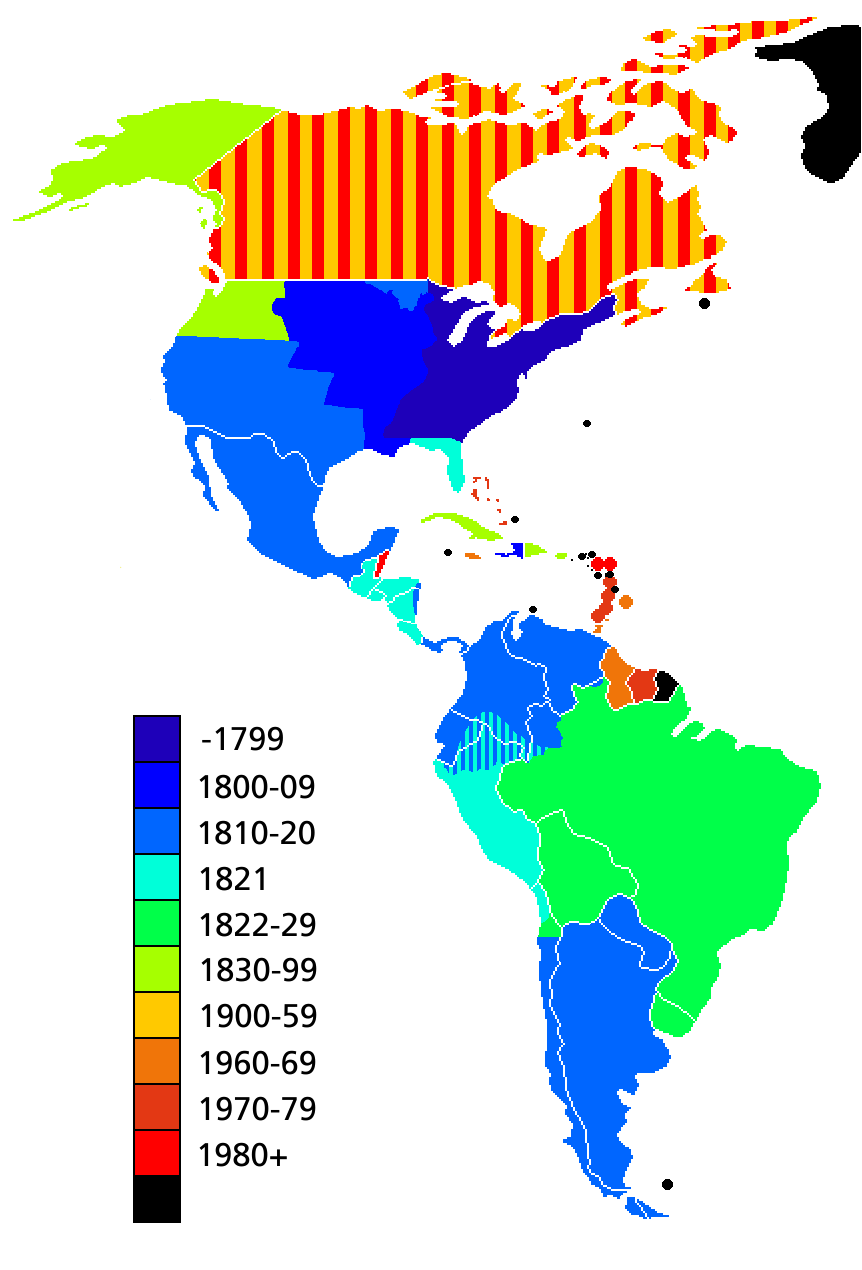
Places in the Americas by date of independence. Note that the United States did not complete its continental territorial expansion until 1867; Canada did not complete sovereignty as an independent country until 1982.

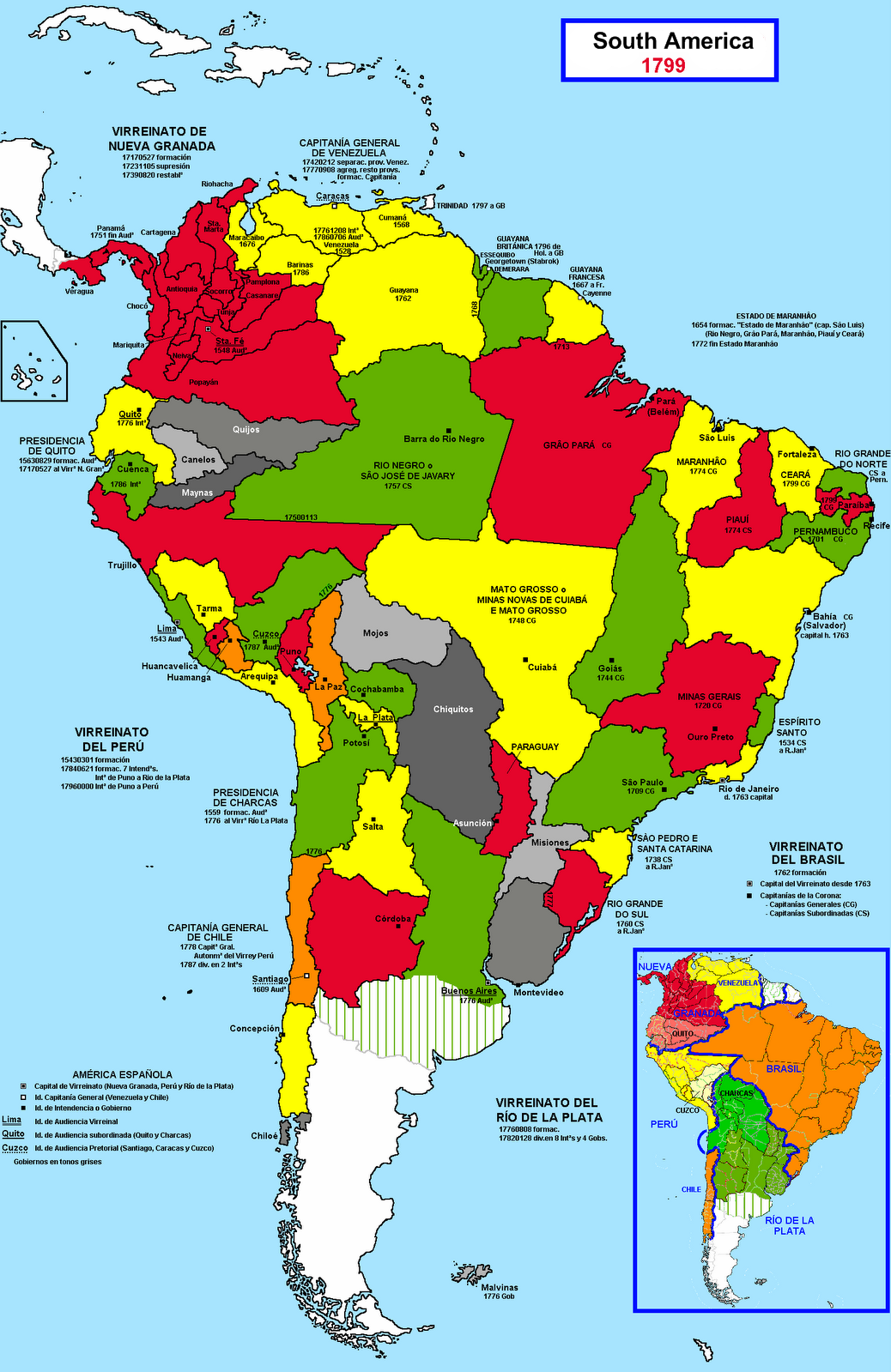
Intendecies (provinces) of the South American viceroyalties.

Except for Cuba and Puerto Rico, the Spanish colonies in the Americas won their independence during the first quarter of the 19th century.

During the Peninsular War, Napoleon installed his brother, Joseph Bonaparte, on the Spanish throne and captured the King Fernando VII. The crisis of political legitimacy sparked a reaction in Spain's overseas empire. Several assemblies were established after 1810 by the Criollos (Latin Americans who are of full or near full Spanish descent) to recover sovereignty and self-government based on the Castilian law and to rule American lands in the name of Ferdinand VII of Spain.

This experience of self-government, along with the influence of Liberalism and the ideas of the French and American Revolutions, brought about a struggle for independence, led by the Libertadores. The territories freed themselves, often with help from foreign mercenaries and privateers. The United States and Europe were neutral, yet aimed to achieve political influence and trade without the Spanish monopoly.

In South America, Simón Bolívar and José de San Martín led the final phase of the independence struggle. Although Bolívar attempted to keep the Spanish-speaking parts of the continent politically unified, they rapidly became independent of one another as well, and several further wars were fought, such as the Paraguayan War and the War of the Pacific.

A related process took place in what is now Mexico, Central America, and parts of North America between 1810 and 1821 with the Mexican War of Independence. Independence was achieved in 1821 by a coalition uniting under Agustín de Iturbide and the Army of the Three Guarantees. Unity was maintained for a short period under the First Mexican Empire, but within a decade the region fought against the United States over the borderlands (losing the bordering lands of California and Texas). Most of the heat was during the official Mexican-American War from 1846 to 1848.

In 1898, in the Greater Antilles, the United States won the Spanish–American War and occupied Cuba and Puerto Rico, ending Spanish territorial control in the Americas.

=== Argentina ===
After the defeat of Spain in the Peninsular War and the abdication of King Ferdinand VII, the Spanish colonial government of the Viceroyalty of the Río de la Plata, present-day Argentina, majority of Bolivia, parts of Chile, Paraguay and Uruguay, became greatly weakened. Without a recognized king on the Spanish throne to render the office of the Viceroy legitimate, the right of Viceroy Baltasar Hidalgo de Cisneros to govern came under fire. The local elites, tired of the Spanish trade restrictions and taxes, seized the opportunity and during the May Revolution of 1810, removed Cisneros and created the first local government, the Primera Junta.

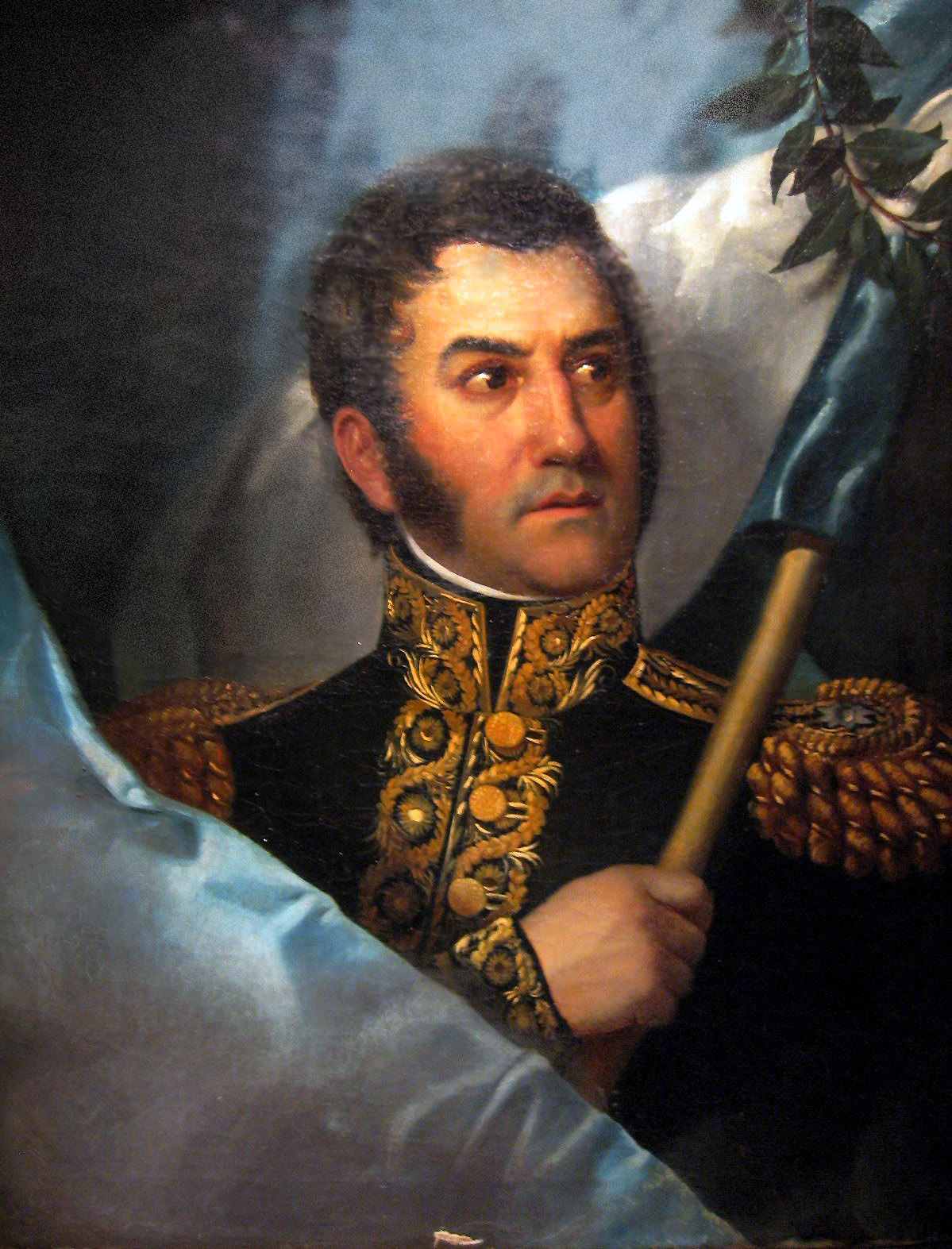
José de San Martín

Following half a decade of battles and skirmishes with provincial royalist forces within the former Vice-royalty along with military expeditions across the Andes to Chile, Peru and Bolivia led by General José de San Martín to finally end Spanish rule in America, a formal declaration was signed on 9 July 1816, by an assembly in San Miguel de Tucumán, declaring full independence with provisions for a national constitution. The Argentine Constitution was signed in 1853, declaring the creation of the Argentine Republic.

=== Bolivia ===
Following upheaval caused by the May Revolution, along with the independence movements in Chile and Venezuela, a local struggle for independence kicked off with two failed revolutions. Over sixteen years of struggle followed before the first steps toward the establishment of a republic were taken.

Formally, it is considered that the fight for independence culminated in the Battle of Ayacucho, on 9 December 1824.

Retreat of European colonialism and change of political borders in South America, 1700–present

=== Colombia ===
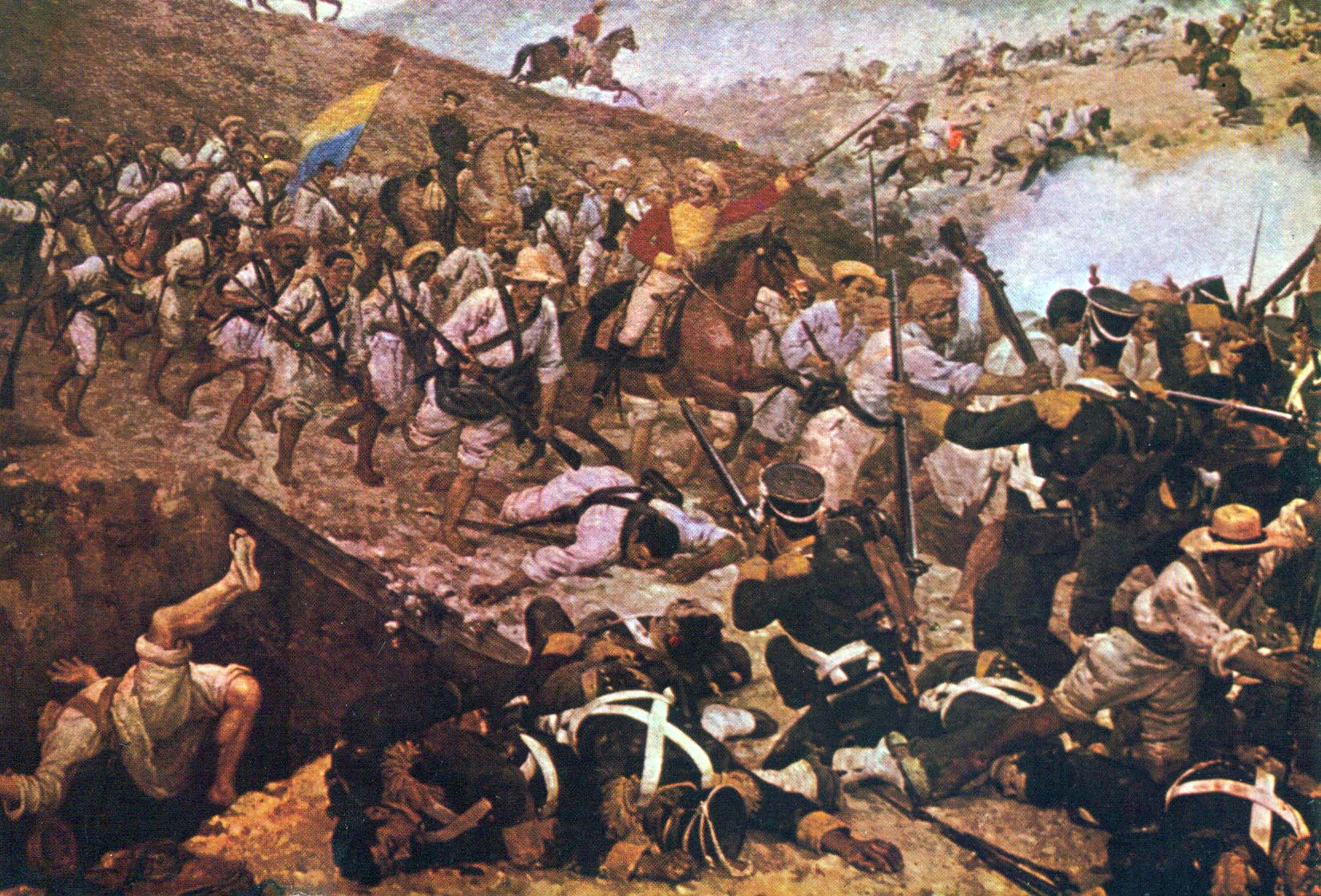
The Battle of Boyacá sealed Colombia's independence

Colombia was the first South American country to declare independence from Spain and the third oldest independent country after Haiti and the United States.

=== Chile ===
The Chilean Independence campaign was led by Liberator General Jose de San Martin with the support of Chilean exiles such as Bernardo O'Higgins. The local independence movement was composed of Chilean-born criollos, who sought political and economic independence from Spain. The independence movement was far from gaining unanimous support among Chileans, who became divided between independentists and royalists. What started as an elitist political movement against their colonial master, finally ended as a full-fledged civil war. Traditionally, the process is divided into three stages: Patria Vieja, Reconquista, and Patria Nueva.

=== Ecuador ===
The first uprising against Spanish rule took place in 1809, and criollos in Ecuador set up a junta on 22 September 1810, to rule in the name of the Bourbon monarch; but as elsewhere, it allowed assertion of their power. Only in 1822 did Ecuador fully gain independence and became part of Gran Colombia, from which it withdrew in 1830. At the Battle of Pichincha, near present-day Quito, Ecuador on 24 May 1822, General Antonio José de Sucre's forces defeated a Spanish force defending Quito. The Spanish defeat guaranteed the liberation of Ecuador.

=== Guatemala ===
In 1821, the entire Kingdom of Guatemala was peacefully subject to Spanish rule. With the innovations produced by the constitutional system, the freedom of the press and the exaltation of the parties, which were born in the popular elections, opinion in favor of independence spread.

Those in favor of independence held meetings in Guatemala, but they did not have the resources to rise up against the government; they expected everything from the progress made in Mexico by the Plan of Iguala or Plan of Independence. Likewise, not all the independentists were in agreement with the system of government proclaimed by Iturbide, much less by the dynasty called to the Mexican throne, but then it was only about independence, each one reserving their opinion regarding the forms of government.

On September 13, the minutes of Ciudad Real de Chiapas and other towns of that State adhering to the Plan of Iguala were received in Guatemala; the advances that the army was making gave all their strength to the pronouncements of Chiapas, which by itself never had any political importance in that kingdom.

The trustee of the Guatemala City Council, Mr. Mariano Aycinena, requested an extraordinary session to present a petition in order to proclaim independence.

=== Mexico ===
Independence in Mexico was a protracted struggle from 1808 until the fall of the royal government in 1821 and the establishment of independent Mexico. In the Viceroyalty of New Spain, as elsewhere in Spanish America in 1808, people reacted to the unexpected French invasion of the Iberian peninsula and the ouster of the Bourbon king, replaced by Joseph Bonaparte. Local American-born Spaniards saw the opportunity to seize control from Viceroy José de Iturrigaray who may well have been sympathetic to creoles' aspirations. Iturrigaray was ousted by pro-royalists. A few from among the creole elites sought independence, including Juan Aldama, Ignacio Allende, and the secular parish priest Miguel Hidalgo y Costilla. Hidalgo made a proclamation in his home parish of Dolores, which was not recorded in writing at the time, but denounced the bad government and gachupines (pejorative for peninsular-born Spaniards), and declared independence. The unorganized hordes following Hidalgo wrought destruction on the property and the lives of whites in the region of the Bajío. Hidalgo was caught, defrocked, and executed in 1811, along with Allende. Their heads remained on display until 1821. His former student José María Morelos continued the rebellion and was himself caught and killed in 1815. The struggle of Mexican insurgents continued under the leadership of Vicente Guerrero and Guadalupe Victoria. From 1815 to 1820 there was a stalemate in New Spain, with royalist forces unable to defeat the insurgents and the insurgents unable to expand beyond their narrow territory in the southern region. Again, events in Spain intervened, with an uprising of military men against Ferdinand VII and the restoration of the liberal Spanish Constitution of 1812, which mandated a constitutional monarchy and curtailed the power of the Roman Catholic Church. The monarch repudiated the constitution once the Spanish monarchy was restored in 1814. For conservatives in New Spain, these changed political circumstances threatened the institutions of church and state. Royal military officer Agustín de Iturbide seized the opportunity to lead, allying with his former enemy Guerrero. Iturbide proclaimed the Plan de Iguala, which called for independence, equality of peninsular and American-born Spaniards, a monarchy with a prince from Spain as king, and secured Catholicism as the proclaimed state religion. He persuaded the insurgent Guerrero to ally with him and create the Army of the Three Guarantees. Juan O'Donojú, the final Viceroy of New Spain, and Iturbide settled a treaty in Córdoba which recognized Mexico as independent from the Spanish Empire. Iturbide and O'Donojú entered Mexico City with the Army of the Three Guarantees on September 27, 1821, where the remaining Spanish forces surrendered. With no European monarch presenting himself for the Crown of Mexico, Iturbide himself was proclaimed emperor Agustín I in 1822. He was overthrown in 1823 and Mexico was established as a republic. Decades of political and economic instability ensued which resulted in a population decline.

=== Paraguay ===
Paraguay gained its independence on the night of May 14 and the morning of May 15, 1811, after a plan organized by various pro-independence nationalists including Fulgencio Yegros and José Gaspar Rodríguez de Francia.

=== Peru ===
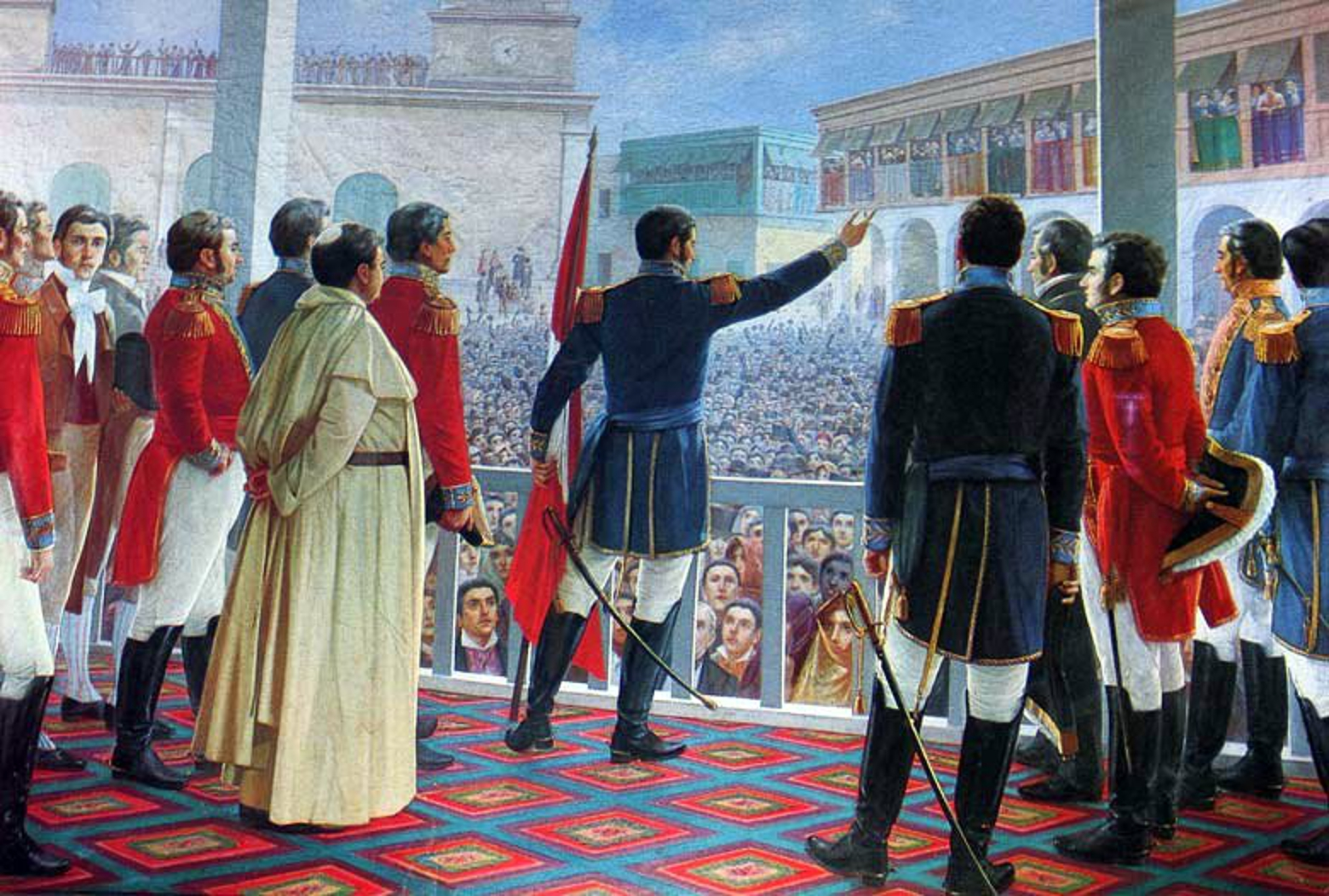
Painting of José de San Martín's proclamation of the independence of Peru on 28 July 1821 in Lima

Spain initially had the support of the Lima oligarchs because of their opposition to the commercial interests of Buenos Aires and Chile. Therefore, the Viceroyalty of Peru became the last redoubt of the Spanish Monarchy in South America. Nevertheless, a Creole rebellion arose in 1812 in Huánuco and another in Cusco between 1814 and 1816. Both were suppressed. These rebellions were supported by the armies of Buenos Aires.

Peru finally succumbed after the decisive continental campaigns of José de San Martín (1820–1823) and Simón Bolívar (1824). While San Martín was in charge of the land campaign, a newly built Chilean Navy led by Lord Cochrane transported the fighting troops and launched a sea campaign against the Spanish fleet in the Pacific. San Martín, who had displaced the royalists of Chile after the Battle of Maipú, and who had disembarked in Paracas in 1820, proclaimed the independence of Peru in Lima on 28 July 1821. Four years later, the Spanish Monarchy was defeated definitively at the Battle of Ayacucho in late 1824.

After independence, the conflicts of interests that faced different sectors of Creole Peruvian society and the particular ambitions of the caudillos, made the organization of the country excessively difficult. Only three civilians — Manuel Pardo, Nicolás de Piérola, and Francisco García Calderón — acceded to the presidency in the first seventy-five years of Peru's independence. The Republic of Bolivia was created in Upper Peru. In 1837, a Peru-Bolivian Confederation was also created, but was dissolved two years later due to Chilean military intervention.

=== Uruguay ===
Following the events of the May Revolution, in 1811 José Gervasio Artigas led a successful revolt against the Spanish forces in the Provincia Oriental, now Uruguay, joining the independentist movement that was taking place in the Viceroyalty of the Río de la Plata at the time. In 1821, the Provincia Oriental was invaded by Portugal, trying to annex it into Brazil under the name of Província Cisplatina.

The former Vice-royalty of the Río de la Plata, United Provinces of the Río de la Plata, fought back against Brazil in a war that lasted over 2 years, eventually turning into a stalemate. The Brazilian forces withdrew with the United Provinces keeping them at bay but failing to win any decisive victory. With neither side gaining the upper hand and the economic burden of the war crippling the United Provinces economy, the Treaty of Montevideo was signed in 1828, fostered by Britain, declaring Uruguay as an independent state.

=== Venezuela ===
According to the Encyclopedia Americana of 1865, General Francisco de Miranda, already a hero to the French, Prussians, English, and Americans had garnered a series of successes against the Spanish between 1808 and 1812. He had effectively negated their access to all the ports in the Caribbean, thus preventing them from receiving reinforcements and supplies, and was essentially conducting mopping-up operations throughout the country. At that point, he convinced Simon Bolívar to join the struggle and put him in charge of the fort at Puerto Cabello. This was all at once a supply and arms depot, a strategic port, and the central holding facility for Spanish prisoners. Through what amounts to a gross dereliction of duty, Simon Bolívar neglected to enforce the customary security dispositions before departing to a social event. During the night there was an uprising of the Spanish prisoners and they managed to subdue the Independentist garrison and gain control of the supplies, arms and ammunition, and the port. The Loyalist forces progressively regained control of the country and eventually, Monteverde's successes forced the newly formed congress of the republic to ask Miranda that he sign a capitulation at La Victoria in Aragua, on July 12, 1812, thus ending the first phase of the revolutionary war.

After the capitulation of 1812, Simón Bolívar turned over Francisco de Miranda to the Spanish authorities, secured a safe passage for himself and his closest officers, and fled to New Granada. He later returned with a new army, while the war had entered a tremendously violent phase. After much of the local aristocracy had abandoned the cause of independence, blacks and mulattoes carried on the struggle. Elites reacted with open distrust and opposition to the efforts of these common people. Bolívar's forces invaded Venezuela from New Granada in 1813, waging a campaign with a ferocity captured perfectly by their motto of "war to the death". Bolívar's forces defeated Domingo Monteverde's Spanish army in a series of battles, taking Caracas on August 6, 1813, and besieging Monteverde at Puerto Cabello in September 1813.

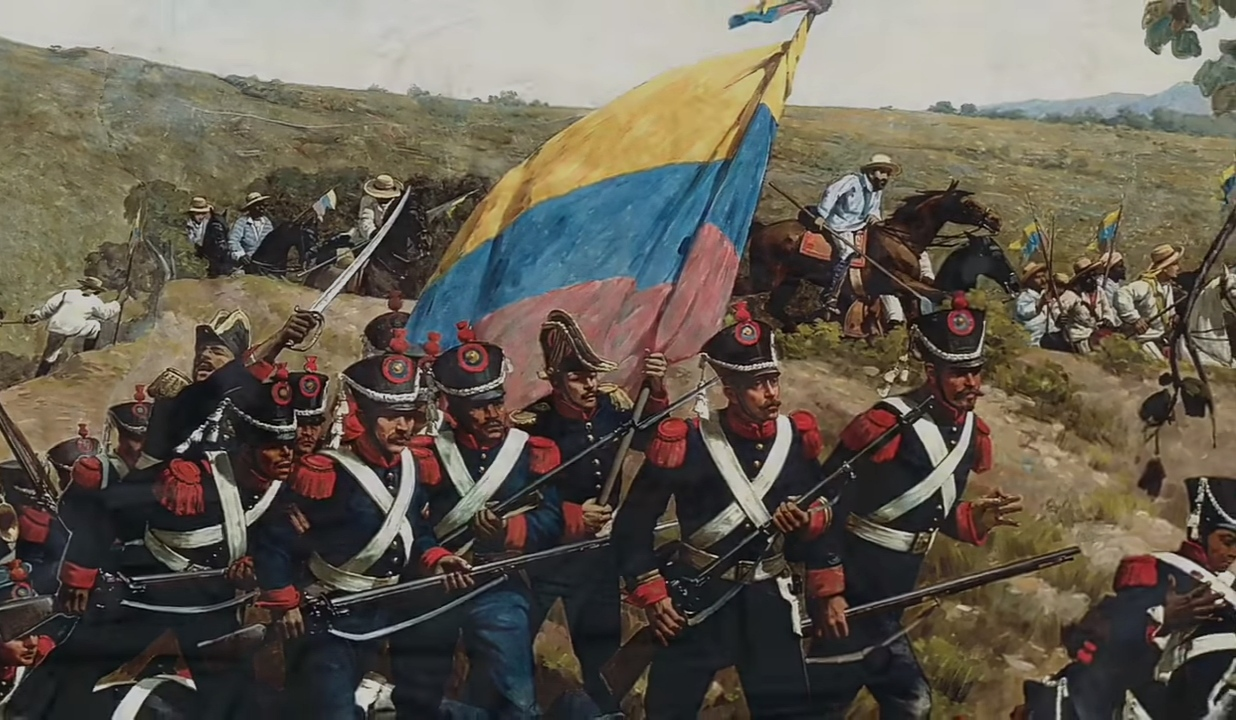
Battle of Carabobo

With loyalists displaying the same passion and violence, the rebels achieved only short-lived victories. The army led by the loyalist José Tomás Boves demonstrated the key military role that the Llaneros came to play in the region's struggle. Turning the tide against independence, these highly mobile, ferocious fighters made up a formidable military force that pushed Bolívar out of his home country once more. In 1814, heavily reinforced Spanish forces in Venezuela lost a series of battles to Bolívar's forces but then decisively defeated Bolivar at La Puerta on June 15, took Caracas on July 16, and again defeated his army at Aragua on August 18, for 2,000 Spanish casualties out of 10,000 soldiers as well as most of the 3,000 in the rebel army. Bolívar and other leaders then returned to New Granada. Later that year the largest expeditionary force ever sent by Spain to America arrived under the command of Pablo Morillo. This force effectively replaced the improvised llanero units, who were disbanded by Morillo.

Bolívar and other republican leaders returned to Venezuela in December 1816, leading a largely unsuccessful insurrection against Spain from 1816 to 1818 from bases in the Llanos and Ciudad Bolívar in the Orinoco River area.

In 1819 Bolívar successfully invaded New Granada, and returned to Venezuela in April 1821, leading an army of 7,000. At Carabobo on June 24, his forces decisively defeated Spanish and colonial forces, winning Venezuelan independence, although hostilities continued.

== Brazil ==
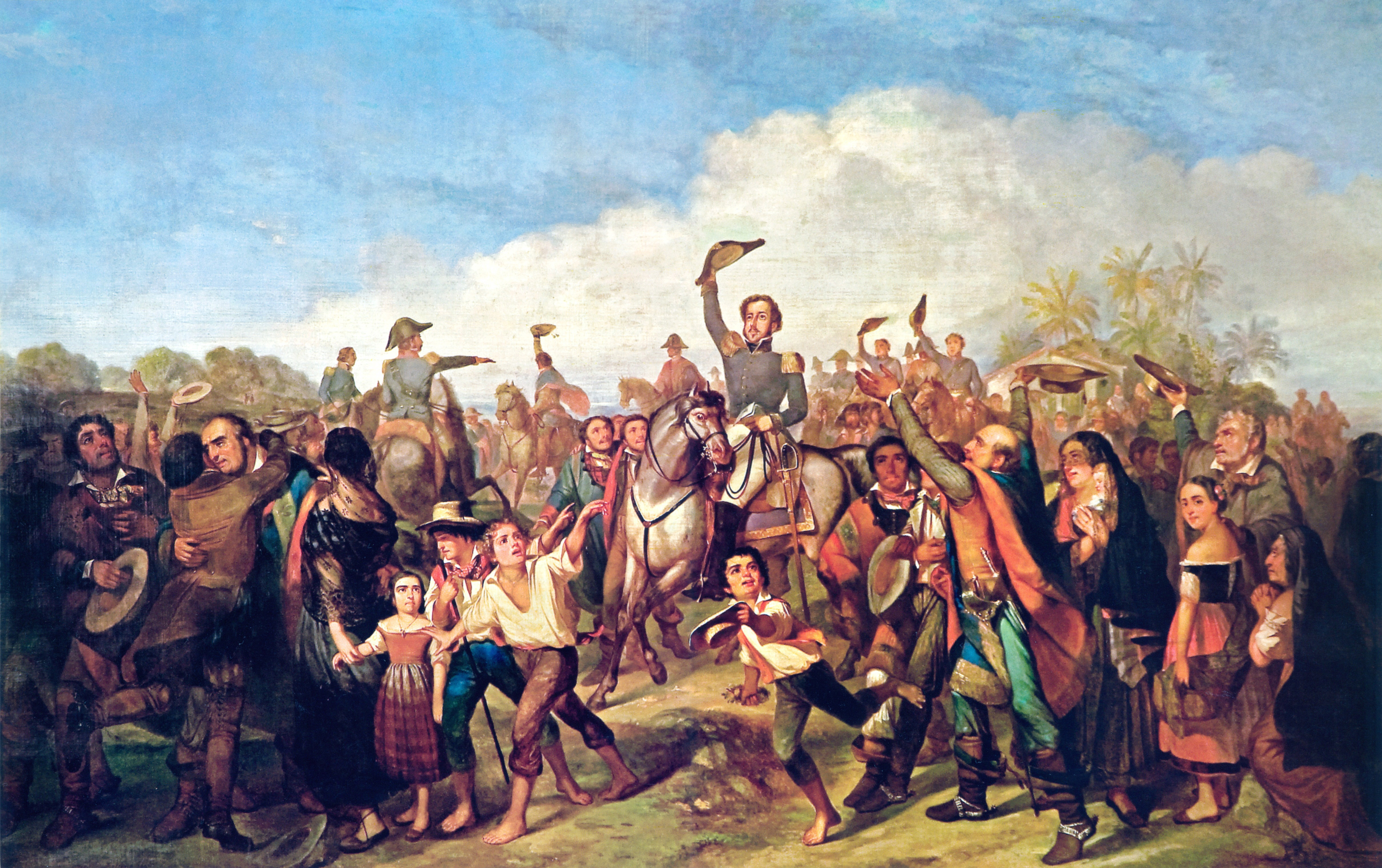
Prince Pedro in São Paulo after giving the news of the Brazilian independence on 7 September 1822

Unlike the Spanish, the Portuguese did not divide their colonial territory in the Americas. The captaincies they created were subdued to a centralized administration in Salvador which reported directly to the Crown in Lisbon. Therefore, it is not common to refer to "Portuguese America" (like Spanish America, Dutch America, etc.), but rather to Brazil, as a unified colony since its very beginnings.

As a result, Brazil did not split into several states by the time of independence (1822), as happened to its Spanish-speaking neighbors. The adoption of a monarchy instead of a federal republic in the first six decades of Brazilian political sovereignty also contributed to the nation's unity.

After several failed revolts in the Portuguese colony, Dom Pedro I (also Pedro IV of Portugal), son of the Portuguese king Dom João VI, proclaimed the country's independence in 1822 and became Brazil's first Emperor. This began when Napoleon Bonaparte forced the Portuguese court out of their capital city of Lisbon and into exile in Brazil. Over the next eight years, the capital of the Portuguese empire would be located in Rio de Janeiro. In 1815, after Lisbon was reclaimed from the French by the Portuguese, King Dom João VI declared that Rio and Lisbon would become equal centers of the empire. King João VI was forced back to Lisbon in 1821 by the Portuguese Cortes but left his son Dom Pedro behind to run Rio. A year later, Dom Pedro declared independence for Brazil and officially became emperor Pedro I. Although Brazil's independence was met with little resistance from Portugal, several small-scale battles were fought against Portuguese loyalist forces until 1824 to bring the rest of the Brazilian territories under the control of the new Brazilian government, and they were officially recognized by their former colonial overlords in 1825.

== Canada ==
Canada's transition from colonial rule to independence occurred gradually over many decades and was achieved mostly through political means, as opposed to the violent revolutions that marked the end of colonialism in other North and South American countries. Attempts at revolting against the British, such as the Rebellions of 1837–1838, were brief and quickly put down. Canada was declared a dominion within the British Empire in 1867. Originally, the Canadian Confederation included just a few of what are now Canada's eastern provinces; other British colonies in modern-day Canada, such as British Columbia, Prince Edward Island, and Newfoundland, would join later (the last only in 1949). Additionally, Britain's and Norway's claims to Arctic lands were ceded to Canada in the late 19th and early 20th centuries. By 1931, the United Kingdom had relinquished its control over Canada's foreign policy. What few political links that remained between Canada and the UK were formally severed in 1982 with the Canada Act.

== 20th century ==
Other countries did not gain independence until the 20th century:

From Spain:

- Cuba

From the United Kingdom:

- Jamaica: from the United Kingdom, in 1962
- Trinidad and Tobago: from the United Kingdom, in 1962
- Guyana (formerly British Guiana): from the United Kingdom, in 1966.
- Barbados: from the United Kingdom, in 1966
- Bahamas: Granted internal self-government in 1964 and, then achieved full independence from the United Kingdom in 1973.
- Grenada: from the United Kingdom, in 1974
- Dominica: from the United Kingdom, in 1978
- Saint Lucia: from the United Kingdom, in 1979
- St. Vincent and the Grenadines: from the United Kingdom, in 1979
- Antigua and Barbuda: from the United Kingdom, in 1981
- Belize (formerly British Honduras): from the United Kingdom, in 1981
- Saint Kitts and Nevis: from the United Kingdom, in 1983

From the Netherlands:

- Suriname: from the Netherlands, in 1975

== Current non-sovereign territories ==
Some parts of the Americas are still administered by European countries or the United States:

- Anguilla (United Kingdom)
- Aruba (Netherlands)
- Bermuda (United Kingdom)
- Bonaire (Netherlands)
- British Virgin Islands (United Kingdom)
- Cayman Islands (United Kingdom)
- Curaçao (Netherlands)
- Falkland Islands (United Kingdom)
- French Guiana (France)
- Greenland (Kingdom of Denmark)
- Guadeloupe (France)
- Martinique (France)
- Montserrat (United Kingdom)
- Puerto Rico (United States)
- Saba (Netherlands)
- Saint Barthelemy (France)
- Saint Martin (France)
- Saint-Pierre and Miquelon (France)
- Sint Eustatius (Netherlands)
- Sint Maarten (Netherlands)
- South Georgia and South Sandwich Islands (United Kingdom)
- Turks and Caicos Islands (United Kingdom)
- United States Virgin Islands (United States)

Some of the remaining non-sovereign territories of the Americas have retained this status by choice, and enjoy a significant degree of self-government. (Some have nevertheless been placed on the U.N. list of non-self-governing territories, an ongoing subject of controversy.) Aruba, for example, seceded from the Netherlands Antilles on January 1, 1986, and became a separate, self-governing member of the Kingdom of the Netherlands. A movement toward full independence by 1996 was halted at Aruba's request in 1990. French Guiana, Guadeloupe and Martinique are not considered dependent territories of France, but have been "incorporated" into France itself, as overseas départements (départements d'outre-mer, or DOM). Other regions however have had or currently have movements to change their political status, for example, different movements to change the political status of Puerto Rico and intermittent calls for independence in other non-sovereign territories such as Martinique and others, with differing amounts of support. An independence referendum in Bermuda in 1995 resulted in a massive "no" vote.

== Timeline ==
Country (Note: Timeline list arranged according to current countries. Explanatory notes are added in cases where decolonization was achieved jointly or where the current state is formed by a merger of previously decolonized states. For simplicity's sake, the numerous U.S. military occupations that occurred during the Banana Wars are not listed here despite accusations of American imperialism.)	Colonial name	Colonial power (Note: Some territories changed hands multiple times, so the list is mentioned as the last colonial power.)	Independence date (Note: Date of decolonization. Subsequent mergers, secessions and civil and other wars in the period after decolonization and the resulting states and federations are not part of this list and are only noted – see the list of sovereign states by formation date. Any discrepancies between dates listed here and public holidays celebrating the country's independence (and whether the date listed is celebrated as a holiday at all) are noted, as well as the national day if the country does not have an independence day. Date when a commonwealth realm abolished its monarchy is noted. Note that a large number of states (i.e. those formed in the aftermath of the Spanish American wars of independence) would not be recognized by their colonial power as independent until decades later.)	First head of state (Note: For countries that became independent either as a Commonwealth realm or as a parliamentary republic the head of government is listed instead.)	Independence won through
United States	Thirteen Colonies	British Empire	July 4, 1776; September 3, 1783 (Note: After independence the United States colonized and later incorporated in their federal structure, territories on their own. The last acquisition in the Americas was in 1935, the last incorporation in 1959, but some of the territories remain unincorporated.)	George Washington (Note: Assumed office on April 30, 1789 as President. From September 5, 1774 until Washington's inauguration the United States was nominally headed by the President of the Continental Congress. Elias Boudinot held the office on the date of independence.)	American Revolutionary War, Siege of Yorktown
Haiti	Saint-Domingue	Kingdom of France (until 1792); French First Republic	January 1, 1804 (Note: Not recognized by France until April 17, 1825.)	Jean-Jacques Dessalines (Note: Jean-Pierre Boyer was President on the date of France's recognition.)	Haitian Revolution
Argentina	Viceroyalty of the Río de la Plata	Spanish Empire	May 25, 1810; July 9, 1816 (Note: Not recognized by Spain until April 29, 1857.)	Juan Martín de Pueyrredón (Note: Justo José de Urquiza was President on the date of Spain's recognition.)	Argentine War of Independence
Paraguay	Viceroyalty of the Río de la Plata	Spanish Empire	May 14, 1811	Junta (Note: Composed of the following leaders: Vicente Ignacio Iturbe Domínguez; Juan Valeriano de Zevallos; Fulgencio Yegros; Pedro Juan Caballero and José Gaspar Rodríguez de Francia)	Paraguay campaign
Chile	Captaincy General of Chile	Spanish Empire	September 18, 1810 February 12, 1818 (Note: Not celebrated as a holiday. The date September 18, 1810 (when the Government Junta was formed) is celebrated as Chile's date of independence. Chile would not be recognized by Spain until April 25, 1844.)	Bernardo O'Higgins (Note: Assumed office four days after independence as Supreme Director. Manuel Bulnes was President on the date of Spain's recognition.)	Chilean War of Independence
Colombia as part of Gran Colombia	Viceroyalty of New Granada	Spanish Empire	August 7, 1819 (Note: Celebrated as Battle of Boyacá Day. The date July 20, 1810 (when Viceroy Antonio José Amar y Borbón formally declared New Granada's independence) is celebrated as Colombia's date of independence.)	Simón Bolívar	Bolívar's campaign to liberate New Granada
Venezuela as part of Gran Colombia	Captaincy General of Venezuela	Spanish Empire	June 24, 1821 (Note: Not celebrated as a holiday. After declaring independence from Spain on July 5, 1811 with the enactment of the Venezuelan Declaration of Independence, the territory of present-day Venezuela continued to struggle for its independence until June 24, 1821 when the decisive victory of Simón Bolívar and Venezuelan forces over the Spanish at the Battle of Carabobo led to the independence of the country from Spain and the establishment of the Republic of Gran Colombia, from which Venezuela gained independence on January 13, 1830. Venezuela celebrates July 5, 1811 as its independence day.)	Simón Bolívar	Venezuelan War of Independence, Battle of Carabobo
Costa Rica as part of Federal Republic of Central America	Captaincy General of Guatemala	Spanish Empire	September 15, 1821 (Note: After gaining independence from Spain, the Federal Republic of Central America was annexed by the Mexican Empire on January 25, 1822. The Federal Republic would regain independence on July 1, 1823.) (Note: On November 15, 1838, Costa Rica formally withdrew from the Federal Republic of Central America and then declared itself as an independent republic on September 28, 1848)	Gabino Gaínza (Note: Pedro Molina Mazariegos, Antonio Rivera Cabezas, and Juan Vicente Villacorta Díaz assumed office as a triumvirate nine days after the Federal Republic of Central America regained independence from Mexico, succeeding Chief of State Vicente Filisola.) (Note: Braulio Carrillo Colina was Head of State when Costa Rica withdrew from the Federal Republic of Central America. José María Castro Madriz was President when Costa Rica declared its sovereignty.)	Act of Independence of Central America
Guatemala as part of Federal Republic of Central America	Captaincy General of Guatemala	Spanish Empire	September 15, 1821 (Note: Sometime around 1840 Guatemala formally withdrew from the Federal Republic of Central America and became an independent republic on March 21, 1847.)	Gabino Gaínza (Note: Mariano Rivera Paz was Head of State around the time of Guatemala's withdrawal from the Federal Republic of Central America. Rafael Carrera became President upon the declaration of Guatemala's sovereignty.)	Act of Independence of Central America
Nicaragua as part of Federal Republic of Central America	Captaincy General of Guatemala	Spanish Empire	September 15, 1821	Gabino Gaínza	Act of Independence of Central America
Honduras as part of Federal Republic of Central America	Captaincy General of Guatemala	Spanish Empire	September 15, 1821 (Note: On November 15, 1838, Honduras formally withdrew from the Federal Republic of Central America and became an independent state.)	Gabino Gaínza (Note: Francisco Zelaya y Ayes was sworn in as Acting President on September 21, 1839. From November 12, 1838, from the Federal Republic to Zelaya y Ayes' inauguration, Honduras was headed by a provisional President. José Lino Matute held office on the date of independence.)	Act of Independence of Central America
El Salvador as part of Federal Republic of Central America	Captaincy General of Guatemala	Spanish Empire	September 15, 1821 (Note: On February 18, 1841, El Salvador (by then the only member remaining in the Federal Republic of Central America), formally withdrew and became an independent state.)	Gabino Gaínza (Note: Juan Lindo was President when El Salvador withdrew from the Federal Republic.)	Act of Independence of Central America
Mexico	Viceroyalty of New Spain	Spanish Empire	September 27, 1821	Agustín I	Mexican War of Independence
Dominican Republic (Note: as the Republic of Spanish Haiti)	Captaincy General of Santo Domingo	Spanish Empire	November 20, 1821 (Note: Not celebrated as a holiday. After gaining independence from Spain, the Republic of Spanish Haiti was annexed by Haiti on February 9, 1822. On November 6, 1844, after months of fighting starting from February 27 of that year, the Dominican Republic regained sovereignty upon the ratification of the Constitution of the Dominican Republic. The February 27 date is celebrated as the Dominican Republic's date of independence.)	José Núñez de Cáceres (Note: Pedro Santana was the President of the Central Government Junta on the date of ratification of the Dominican Constitution.)	-
Panama as part of Gran Colombia	Viceroyalty of New Granada	Spanish Empire	November 28, 1821	Simón Bolívar	-
Ecuador as part of Gran Colombia	Viceroyalty of New Granada	Spanish Empire	May 24, 1822 (Note: Celebrated as Battle of Pichincha Day. The date August 10, 1909 (when the city of Quito formally declared Ecuador's independence) is celebrated as Ecuador's date of independence. On May 13, 1830, Ecuador formally seceded from Gran Colombia.)	Simón Bolívar (Note: Juan José Flores was Jéfe Supremo when Ecuador seceded from Gran Colombia.)	Ecuadorian War of Independence
Peru	Viceroyalty of Peru	Spanish Empire	December 9, 1824	Simón Bolívar	Peruvian War of Independence
Bolivia	Real Audiencia of Charcas	Spanish Empire	August 6, 1825 (Note: Not recognized by Spain until July 21, 1847.)	Simón Bolívar (Note: Assumed office six days after independence as President. José Ballivián was President on the date of Spain's recognition.)	Bolivian War of Independence
Brazil (Note: As the Empire of Brazil.)	United Kingdom of Portugal, Brazil and the Algarves	Portuguese Empire	August 29, 1825 (Note: Not celebrated as a holiday. Brazil’s independence from Portugal was officially recognized on August 29, 1825 by the Treaty of Rio de Janeiro. The date September 7, 1822 (when then-Prince Regent Dom Pedro formally declared Brazil's independence) is celebrated as Brazil's date of independence.)	Pedro I	Brazilian War of Independence
Uruguay	Viceroyalty of the Río de la Plata; Cisplatina Province	Spanish Empire; Empire of Brazil	August 27, 1828 (Note: Not celebrated as a holiday. After its decisive victory over Spanish forces at the Battle of Las Piedras, Uruguay continued to struggle for its independence against Spain. From 1816 to 1820, the territory of present-day Uruguay was invaded and conquered by the Portuguese Empire during the Portuguese conquest of the Banda Oriental. Uruguay was formally annexed firstly by the Portuguese Empire in 1821 and secondly by the Empire of Brazil in 1822 as a Brazilian province under the name Cisplatina. Uruguay declared independence from the Empire of Brazil on August 25, 1825, but its independence was officially recognized on August 27, 1828 by the Preliminary Peace Convention. Uruguay celebrates August 25, 1825 as its independence day.)	José Gervasio Artigas; Juan Antonio Lavalleja	Battle of Las Piedras; Cisplatine War
Dominican Republic (Note: On March 18, 1861, the Dominican Republic under Pedro Santana formally rejoined the Spanish Empire as a colony. This proved to be very unpopular among the Dominican people, and on August 16, 1865, the Dominican Republic became independent once again.)	Captaincy General of Santo Domingo	Spanish Empire	August 16, 1865 (Note: Celebrated as Restoration Day.)	José María Cabral	Dominican Restoration War
Canada	Province of Canada; New Brunswick; Nova Scotia	United Kingdom	July 1, 1867 (Note: Celebrated as Canada Day. The Dominion of Canada was constituted through the Constitution Act, 1867 entering into force on July 1, 1867. On December 11, 1931, it got increased self-governance powers through the Statute of Westminster, followed by complete sovereignty on April 17, 1982, after the passage of the Canada Act 1982. Because of these decades-long steps, Canada Day is not considered to be a celebration of Canada's independence (although it is usually celebrated as such).)	John A. Macdonald (Note: R. B. Bennett and Pierre Trudeau were respectively the Prime Minister on the date of passage of the Statute of Westminster and the Canada Act.)	Canadian Confederation (Note: The Rebellions of 1837 were a pair of Canadian armed uprisings that occurred in 1837 and 1838 in response to frustrations in political reform.)
Cuba	(Restoration (Spain)) Captaincy General of Cuba	Spain (Note: De jure. De facto the United States.)	December 10, 1898 (Note: Date marking the end of Spanish rule over Cuba. Not celebrated as a holiday. From this date to May 20, 1902, Cuba was occupied by the United States, supposedly to help Cuba prepare for independence. However, the terms of the Platt Amendment meant that the United States continued to dominate Cuba long after independence, including another period of occupation. This dominance would last until the end of the Cuban Revolution on January 1, 1959. As a result, Cuba celebrates the date October 10, 1868, as its date of independence, when Carlos Manuel de Céspedes formally declared Cuba's independence and launched the Ten Years' War.)	Tomás Estrada Palma (Note: Assumed office on May 20, 1902 as President. Although Fidel Castro was the de facto leader of Cuba in the aftermath of the Cuban Revolution, he would not assume office until February 16, 1959, as Prime Minister. Manuel Urrutia Lleó was sworn in as President two days after the end of the Cuban Revolution.)	Cuban War of Independence (Note: The Ten Years' War was an earlier armed uprising that failed to gain independence from Spain.)
Jamaica	Jamaica	United Kingdom	August 6, 1962	Alexander Bustamante	(Note: See Independence of Jamaica.)
Trinidad and Tobago	Trinidad and Tobago	United Kingdom	August 31, 1962 (Note: Abolished its commonwealth monarchy on August 1, 1976.)	Eric Williams	-
Guyana	British Guiana	United Kingdom	May 26, 1966 (Note: Abolished its commonwealth monarchy on February 23, 1970.)	Forbes Burnham (Note: Remained Prime Minister when Guyana abolished its monarchy. Arthur Chung was sworn in as President on March 17, 1970. From the abolition of Guyana's monarchy and Chung's inauguration Edward Luckhoo served as Acting President.)	-
Barbados	Barbados	United Kingdom	November 30, 1966 (Note: Abolished its commonwealth monarchy on November 30, 2021.)	Errol Barrow	Barbados Independence Act 1966
Bahamas	Bahamas	United Kingdom	July 10, 1973	Lynden Pindling	-
Grenada	British Windward Islands	United Kingdom	February 7, 1974	Eric Gairy	-
Suriname	Dutch Guiana	Netherlands	November 25, 1975	Johan Ferrier	-
Dominica	British Windward Islands	United Kingdom	November 3, 1978	Patrick John	-
Saint Lucia	British Windward Islands	United Kingdom	February 22, 1979	John Compton	-
Saint Vincent and the Grenadines	British Windward Islands	United Kingdom	October 27, 1979	Milton Cato	-
Belize	British Honduras	United Kingdom	September 21, 1981	George Cadle Price	-
Antigua and Barbuda	British Leeward Islands	United Kingdom	November 1, 1981	Vere Bird	-
Saint Kitts and Nevis	British Leeward Islands	United Kingdom	September 19, 1983	Robert Llewellyn Bradshaw	-

== North America ==
This is a list of all present sovereign states in North America and their predecessors. The division between North and South America is unclear, generally viewed as lying somewhere in the Isthmus of Panama, however, the Caribbean Islands, Central America including the whole of Panama is considered to be part of North America as its southernmost nation. The continent was colonized by the Europeans: Mainly by the Spaniards, the French, the English and the Dutch. The United States of America gained its independence in American Revolutionary War; most of nations in Central America gained independence in the early 19th century; Canada and many other island countries in the Caribbean Sea (most of them were British colonies) gained their independence in 20th century. Today, North America consists of twenty-two sovereign states with common government system being some form of presidential republic.

Sovereign state	Predecessors
Antigua and Barbuda	French Antigua and Barbuda (1649–1671); Colony of Antigua (1671–1816; 1833–1958) (part of British Leeward Islands); Colony of Barbuda (1671–1816; 1833–1958) (part of British Leeward Islands); Part of West Indies Federation (1958–1962); Colony of Antigua (1962–1981) (Associated State since 1967); Antigua and Barbuda (1981–present) (Commonwealth realm)
Bahamas, The	(Kingdom of England) Colony of the Bahamas (1648–1717); Colony of the Bahamas (1717–1973); Commonwealth of the Bahamas (1973–present)
Barbados	French Barbados (1649–1763); Colony of Barbados (1625–1885) (part of British Windward Islands); Colony of Barbados (1885–1958; 1962–1966) (separated Crown colony); Part of West Indies Federation (1958–1962); Barbados (1966–present)
Belize	British Honduras (1862–1973); Belize (1973–1981) (British self-governing colony); Belize (1981–present) (Commonwealth realm)
Canada	New France (1535–1763) (a French colony); Province of Quebec (1763–1791); Province of Upper Canada (1791–1841); Province of Lower Canada (1791–1841); United Province of Canada (1841–1867); Rupert's Land (1670–1870) (a territory of the Hudson's Bay Company); North-Western Territory (1859–1870); Colony of British Columbia (1858–1871) (included the Colony of Vancouver Island and former British Columbia since 1866); Provisional Government of Saskatchewan (1885) (unrecognized Métis republic defeated in the North-West Rebellion); Newfoundland Colony (1610–1907); Dominion of Newfoundland (1907–1949) (a dominion within British Empire 1907–1934, a dependency of United Kingdom 1934–1949); Canada (1867–present) (before the Second World War the term Dominion of Canada were also used)
Costa Rica	Part of Real Audiencia of Guatemala (1543–1609) (part of New Spain); Part of Captaincy General of Guatemala (1609–1821) (part of New Spain); Part of Mexican Empire (1822–1823); Part of Federal Republic of Central America (1823–1838); Free State of Costa Rica (1838–1847); First Costa Rican Republic (1848–1948); Second Costa Rican Republic (1949–present)
Cuba	Part of Captaincy General of Santo Domingo (1512–1607); Captaincy General of Cuba (1607–1898); United States Military Government in Cuba (1898–1902); Republic of Cuba (1902–1959) (1902–1959); Republic of Cuba (1959–present)
Dominica	French Dominica (1649–1763); Colony of Dominica (part of British Leeward Islands 1871–1958) (1763–1958); Part of West Indies Federation (1958–1962); Dominica (1962–1978) (Associated State since 1967); Commonwealth of Dominica (1978–present)
Dominican Republic	Captaincy General of Santo Domingo (1492–1795); French Santo Domingo(1795–1809); Captaincy General of Santo Domingo (1809–1821); Republic of Spanish Haiti (1821–1822); Occupied by Haiti (1822–1844); Dominican Republic (1844–1861); Occupied by Spain (1861–1865); Dominican Republic (1865–present)
El Salvador	Part of Real Audiencia of Guatemala (1543–1609) (part of New Spain); Part of Captaincy General of Guatemala (1609–1821) (part of New Spain); Part of Mexican Empire (1822–1823); Part of Federal Republic of Central America (1823–1841); Republic of El Salvador (1841–present) (before 1890 referred to as Republic of Salvador in English)
Grenada	French Grenada (1649–1763); British Grenada (1763–1958) part of British Windward Islands 1833–1958); Part of West Indies Federation (1958–1962); British Grenada (1962–1974) (Associated State (since 1967); Grenada (Commonwealth realm) (1974–present)
Guatemala	Part of Real Audiencia of Guatemala (1543–1609); Part of Captaincy General of Guatemala (1609–1821); Part of Mexican Empire (1822–1823); Part of Federal Republic of Central America (1823–1839); Republic of Guatemala (1839–present)
Haiti	Colony of Saint-Domingue (1625–1804); Empire of Haiti (1804–1806); State of Haiti (1806–1811) (northern Haiti); Kingdom of Haiti (1811–1820); Republic of Haiti (1806–1849) (included northern Haiti since 1820; with Dominican Republic annexed 1822–1844); Empire of Haiti (1849–1859); Republic of Haiti (1859–present) (occupied by United States 1915–1934)
Honduras	Part of Real Audiencia of Guatemala (1543–1609); Part of Captaincy General of Guatemala (1609–1821); Part of Mexican Empire (1822–1823); Part of Federal Republic of Central America (1823–1838); Republic of Honduras (1838–present)
Jamaica	Colony of Jamaica (1655–1962); Jamaica (1962–present) (Commonwealth realm)
Mexico	Aztec Empire; Viceroyalty of New Spain (1521–1821); Mexican Empire (1821–1823); Provisional Government of Mexico (1823–1824); United Mexican States (1824–1835); Mexican Republic (1835–1846); United Mexican States (1846–1863); Mexican Empire (1863–1867); United Mexican States (1867–present)
Nicaragua	Part of Real Audiencia of Guatemala (1543–1609); Part of Captaincy General of Guatemala (1609–1821); Part of Mexican Empire (1822–1823); Part of Federal Republic of Central America (1823–1838); Republic of Nicaragua (1838–present)
Saint Kitts and Nevis	French Saint Kitts and Nevis (1649–1763); Colony of Saint Christopher (1623–1882) (since 1833 part of British Leeward Islands); Colony of Nevis (1628–1882) (since 1833 part of British Leeward Islands); Colony of Saint Christopher-Nevis-Anguilla (1882–1958) (part of British Leeward Islands; Anguilla separated from 1882 to 1951); Part of West Indies Federation (1958–1962); Saint Christopher-Nevis-Anguilla (1962–1983) (Associated State since 1967; Anguilla separated since 1980); Federation of Saint Kitts and Nevis (1983–present) (also known as the Federation of Saint Christopher and Nevis)
Saint Lucia	Colony of Sainte Lucie (1674–1814); Colony of Saint Lucia (1814–1958) (since 1838 part of British Windward Islands); Part of West Indies Federation (1958–1962); Colony of Saint Lucia (1962–1979) (Associated State since 1967); Saint Lucia (Commonwealth realm) (1979–present)
Saint Vincent and the Grenadines	French Saint Vincent and the Grenadines (1649–1763); Colony of Saint Vincent (1763–1958) (since 1838 part of British Windward Islands); Part of West Indies Federation (1958–1962); Colony of Saint Vincent (1962–1979) (Associated State since 1967); Saint Vincent and the Grenadines (1979–present) (Commonwealth realm)
United States	Thirteen Colonies (1732–1776) -Province of New Hampshire -Province of Massachusetts Bay -Colony of Rhode Island and Providence Plantations -Connecticut Colony -Province of New York -Province of New Jersey -Province of Pennsylvania -Delaware Colony -Province of Maryland -Colony of Virginia -Province of Carolina -Province of North Carolina -Province of South Carolina -Province of Georgia; Vermont Republic (1777–1791); Republic of West Florida (1810); Republic of Indian Stream (1832–1835); Republic of Texas (1836–1846); California Republic (1846); Kingdom of Hawaii (1795–1893), Republic of Hawaii (1894–1898); United States of America (1776–present)

== South America ==
This is a list of all present sovereign states in South America and their predecessors. The division between North and South America is unclear, generally viewed as lying somewhere in the Isthmus of Panama, however, the whole of Panama is considered to be part of North America as its southernmost nation. The continent was colonized by the Europeans: First by the Spaniards, and the Portuguese; and later by the Dutch, the French, and the English. Most of the present-day nations gained independence in the early 19th century. Today, South America consists of twelve sovereign states with common government system being some form of presidential republic.

Sovereign state	Predecessors
Argentina	Viceroyalty of Peru (1542–1776) (Viceroyalty of the Crown of Castile); Viceroyalty of the Río de la Plata (1776–1810) (Viceroyalty of the Spanish Empire); United Provinces of the Río de la Plata (1810–1831); Argentine Confederation (1831–1861); Argentine Republic (1861–present)
Bolivia	Governorate of New Toledo (1528–1542); Viceroyalty of Peru (1542–1776) (Viceroyalty of the Crown of Castile); Viceroyalty of the Río de la Plata (1776–1810) (Viceroyalty of the Spanish Empire); Viceroyalty of Peru (1810–1825) (Viceroyalty of the Spanish Empire); Republic of Bolivia (1825–2009); Plurinational State of Bolivia (2009–present)
Brazil	Colonial Brazil (1500–1815) (colony of Portugal); United Kingdom of Portugal, Brazil and the Algarves (1815–1822); Empire of Brazil (1822–1889); Republic of the United States of Brazil (1889–1930); Republic of the United States of Brazil (1930–1946) (renamed "United States of Brazil" in 1937); United States of Brazil (1946–1964); United States of Brazil (1964–1989) (military dictatorship, renamed "Federative Republic of Brazil" in 1967); Federative Republic of Brazil (1889–present)
Chile	Captaincy General of Chile (1542–1818); Republic of Chile (1818–present)
Colombia	Muisca Confederation (~1450–1540); Viceroyalty of Peru (1542–1717); Viceroyalty of New Granada (1717–1819); Gran Colombia (1819–1831); Republic of New Granada (1831–1858); Granadine Confederation (1858–1863); United States of Colombia (1863–1886); Republic of Colombia (1886–present)
Ecuador	Viceroyalty of Peru (1542–1717); Viceroyalty of New Granada (1717–1822); Gran Colombia (1822–1830); Republic of Ecuador (1830–present)
Guyana	Colony of Essequibo (1616–1815), Berbice (1627–1815) & Colony of Demerara (1745–1815) (all Dutch colonies); British Guiana (1814–1966); Commonwealth Realm of Guyana (1966–1970); Co-operative Republic of Guyana (1970–present)
Panama	Viceroyalty of Peru (1542–1717); Viceroyalty of New Granada (1717–1819); Gran Colombia (1819–1831); Republic of New Granada (1831–1858); Granadine Confederation (1858–1863); United States of Colombia (1863–1906); Republic of Panama (1906–present)
Paraguay	Viceroyalty of the Río de la Plata (1776–1814); Republic of Paraguay (1814–present)
Peru	Inca Empire (1438–1533); Governorate of New Castile (1528–1542) & Governorate of New Toledo (1528–1542) (both Spanish colonies); Viceroyalty of Peru (1542–1824); Republic of Peru (1824–present)
Suriname	Colony of Surinam (1630–1954); Country of Suriname (1954–1975) (constituent country of the Kingdom of the Netherlands)'; Republic of Suriname (1975–present)
Trinidad and Tobago	Viceroyalty of New Granada (1717–1797); British West Indies (1797–1962); Republic of Trinidad and Tobago (1962–present)
Uruguay	United Provinces of the Río de la Plata (1810–1816); United Kingdom of Portugal, Brazil and the Algarves (1816–1822); Empire of Brazil (1822–1828); Eastern Republic of Uruguay (1828–present)
Venezuela	Viceroyalty of New Granada (1717–1819); Gran Colombia (1819–1828); Bolivarian Republic of Venezuela (1828–present) (renamed from "Republic of Venezuela" in 1999)

== World reaction ==
=== United States and Great Britain ===
Great Britain and the United States were rivals for influence in the newly independent sovereign nations. As a result of the successful revolutions which established so many newly independent nations, United States President James Monroe and the Secretary of State John Quincy Adams drafted the Monroe Doctrine. It stated that the United States would not tolerate any European interference in the Western Hemisphere. This measure ostensibly was taken to safeguard the newfound liberties of these new countries, but it was also taken as a precautionary measure against the intrusion of European states. Since the United States was a newly founded nation, it could not prevent other European powers from interfering, for that the United States looked for Britain's help and support to execute the Monroe Doctrine into action.

Great Britain's trade with Latin America greatly expanded during the revolutionary period, which until then was restricted due to Spanish mercantilist trade policies. British pressure was sufficient to prevent Spain from attempting any serious reassertion of its control over its lost colonies.

=== Attempts at hemispheric unity ===
The notion of closer Spanish American cooperation and unity was first put forward by the Liberator Simón Bolívar who, in 1826 Congress of Panama, proposed the creation of a league of American republics, with a common military, a mutual defense pact, and a supranational parliamentary assembly. This meeting was attended by representatives of Gran Colombia (comprising the modern-day nations of Colombia, Ecuador, Panama, and Venezuela), Peru, the United Provinces of Central America (Guatemala, El Salvador, Honduras, Nicaragua, and Costa Rica), and Mexico. Nevertheless, the great distances and geographical barriers, not to mention the different national and regional interests, made union impossible.

Sixty-three years later the Commercial Bureau of the American Republics was established. It was renamed the International Commercial Bureau at the Second International Conference of 1901–1902. These two bodies, in existence as of 14 April 1890, represent the point of inception of today's Organization of American States.

== See also ==
- Colonialism
- Decolonization
- Decolonization of public space
- Wars of national liberation
- Predecessors of sovereign states in South America
- Creole nationalism
- Spanish Empire
- Libertadores
- Spanish reconquest of Mexico
- Spanish American Royalists
- Wars of national liberation
- History of Central America
- History of South America
- History of Cuba
- History of the Dominican Republic
- History of Puerto Rico
- Age of Revolution
- Territorial evolution of the Caribbean
- Spanish American wars of independence
