= Constitution of Uruguay of 1918 =

Supreme law of Uruguay from 1918 to 1933

The second Constitution of Uruguay was in force during the period 1918–1933.

Approved in a referendum on 25 November 1917, it replaced the first Uruguayan Constitution, which had been in force since 1830.

== Overview ==
In 1913 President José Batlle y Ordóñez (1903–07, 1911–15), the father of modern Uruguay, proposed a constitutional reform involving the creation of a Swiss-style collegial executive system to be called the colegiado. A strong opponent of the one-person, powerful presidency, Batlle y Ordóñez believed that a collective executive power would neutralize the dictatorial intentions of political leaders. It met intense opposition, however, not only from the Blancos but also from members of his own Colorado Party. The proposal was defeated in 1916, but Batlle y Ordóñez worked out a deal with a faction of the Blancos whereby a compromise system was provided for in the second constitution, which was approved by a plebiscite on November 25, 1917.

In addition to separating church and state, the new charter, which did not become effective until 1919, introduced substantial changes in the powers of the presidency. The executive power consisted of the president, who controlled foreign relations, national security, and defense, and the National Council of Administration (Consejo Nacional de Administración), or colegiado, which administered all other executive governmental functions (industrial relations, health, public works, industry and labor, livestock and agriculture, education, and the preparation of the budget). The colegiado, embodying the political mechanism of coparticipation, consisted of nine members: six from the majority party and three from the minority party. The first colegiado (1919–33) was thereby established without eliminating the office of president.

Although the 1917 constitution worked well during the prosperous time after World War I, recurring conflicts between the president and the colegiado members made the executive power ineffective in coping with the economic and social crises wracking the country. Batlle y Ordóñez died in 1929, and his absence was deeply felt as conflicts increased. These conflicts eventually led to the presidential coup of 1933 by Gabriel Terra. His ad hoc government suspended the constitution and appointed a constituent assembly to draw up a new constitutional text.

== See also ==
- Constitution of Uruguay
- 1917 Uruguayan constitutional referendum
