= General Constituent and Legislative Assembly of the Eastern State of Uruguay =

Uruguayan constituent assembly

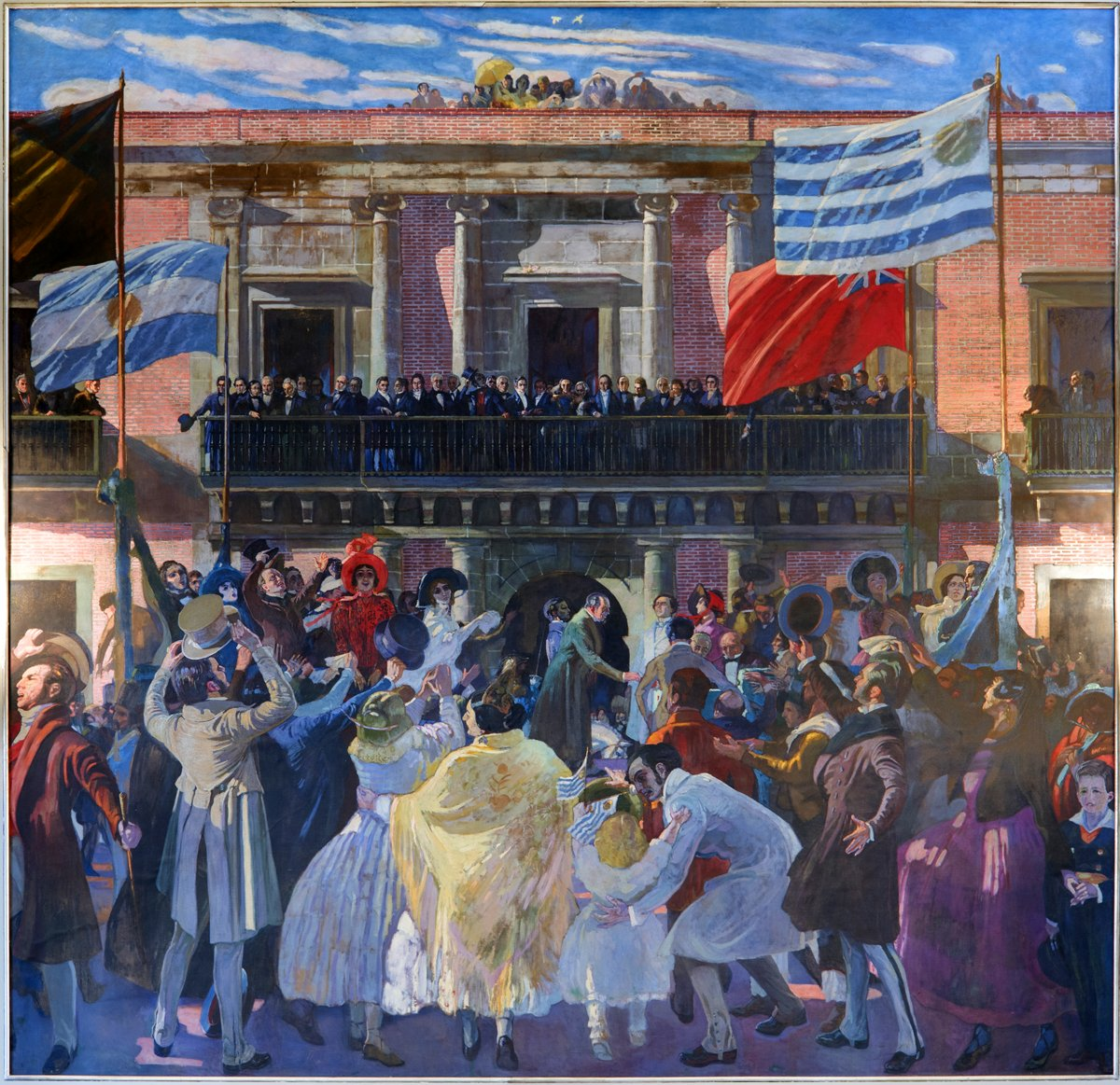
Proclamation of the Constitution of 1830

The General Constituent and Legislative Assembly of the Eastern State of Uruguay (Spanish: Asamblea General Constituyente y Legislativa del Estado Oriental del Uruguay) was summoned in 1828 with the purpose of drafting the first Constitution of Uruguay.

== Overview ==
Originally, following a proposal by Juan Antonio Lavalleja on 26 July 1828, it was planned that the towns of the Eastern Province of the Río de la Plata would elect an assembly with legislative powers; to this end, he summoned all the towns and villages of the Banda Oriental to end the war between them and recognise the independence of Uruguay, a document which was ratified in Montevideo on 4 October 1828. On 25 October 1828, the residents of Montevideo were called upon to elect the Electoral College. On 22 November, meetings began in San José de Mayo; the body adopted the name General Constituent and Legislative Assembly of the State. On 13 December, following the withdrawal of the Brazilian troops occupying Montevideo, the acting governor, Joaquín Suárez, publicly proclaimed the independence of the “State of Montevideo”, declaring an end to the authority of all foreign powers. On 16 December the first flag of Uruguay was approved.

On 17 December, the Assembly moved to the town of Nuestra Señora de Guadalupe, now known as Canelones. On 18 December, the first law concerning the national flag was passed. On 16 February 1829, the Assembly’s meetings were held in the Aguada church of Montevideo. On 18 August the debate on the text of the Constitution was concluded and it was agreed to accept proposals solely for the purpose of improving it prior to its publication. On 1 September, each article of the new Constitution was read out; it contained eight contentious points. On 19 March the coat of arms of Uruguay was approved. On 10 September, it was approved, signed by the members of the Constituent Assembly, and the text of the new Constitution was sent to be printed. On 29 September, in accordance with Article 7 of the Preliminary Peace Convention, the draft Constitution was submitted for review to the governments of Brazil and Buenos Aires.

On 26 June 1830, the Assembly published the text of the Constitution of the Eastern State of Uruguay. On 30 June, a manifesto from the Assembly was issued to the peoples it represented. Finally, on 18 July 1830, the first Constitution was sworn in.

== See also ==
- Constitution of Uruguay
