= List of sovereign states and dependent territories in South America =

There are 12 sovereign states and 3 non-sovereign dependent territories in South America. The continent is bordered on the west by the Pacific Ocean and on the north and east by the Atlantic Ocean. North America and the Caribbean Sea lie to the northwest. South America has an area of approximately 17,840,000 square kilometres (6,890,000 sq mi), or almost 3.5% of Earth's surface. As of 2018, its population is more than 430 million, according to estimates of population in The World Factbook. South America ranks fourth among all continents in area (after Asia, Africa, and North America) and fifth in population (after Asia, Africa, Europe, and North America).

The border between North and South America is at some point in the Isthmus of Panama. The most common demarcation in atlases and other sources follows the Darién Mountains watershed that divides along the Colombia–Panama border where the isthmus meets the South American continent (see Darién Gap). Virtually all atlases list Panama as a state falling entirely within North America and/or Central America.

== Sovereign states ==
A sovereign state is a political association with effective sovereignty over a population for whom it makes decisions in the national interest. According to the Montevideo Convention, a state must have a permanent population, a defined territory, a government, and the capacity to enter into relations with other states. The following states are all members of the United Nations and current or former members of the Union of South American Nations.

| Flag | Map | English short, formal names, and ISO | Domestic short and formal name(s) | Capital | Population 2021 | Area | Currency |
|---|---|---|---|---|---|---|---|
| Flag of Argentina | Map showing Argentina | Argentina Argentine Republic ARG | Spanish: Argentina — República Argentina | Buenos Aires Spanish: Ciudad de Buenos Aires | 45,276,780 | 2,780,400 km^{2} (1,073,518 sq mi) | Argentine peso |
| Flag of Bolivia | Map showing Bolivia | Bolivia Plurinational State of Bolivia BOL | Spanish: Bolivia — Estado Plurinacional de Bolivia Quechua: Buliwya — Puliwya Achka Aylluska Mamallaqta Aymara: Wuliwya — Wuliwya Walja Suyunakana Marka | Sucre (official) and La Paz (seat of government) Spanish: Sucre (Note: While Sucre is the constitutional capital, La Paz is the seat of the government.) | 12,079,472 | 1,098,581 km^{2} (424,164 sq mi) | Bolivian boliviano |
| Flag of Brazil | Map showing Brazil | Brazil Federative Republic of Brazil BRA | Portuguese: Brasil — República Federativa do Brasil | Brasília Portuguese: Brasília | 214,326,223 | 8,514,877 km^{2} (3,287,612 sq mi) | Brazilian real |
| Flag of Chile | Map showing Chile | Chile (Note: Includes Easter Island in the Pacific Ocean, a Chilean territory frequently reckoned in Oceania.) Republic of Chile CHL | Spanish: Chile — República de Chile | Santiago (Note: While Santiago is the constitutional capital of Chile, Valparaíso is the site of legislative meetings.) Spanish: Santiago | 19,493,184 | 756,102 km^{2} (291,933 sq mi) | Chilean peso |
| Flag of Colombia | Map showing Colombia | Colombia Republic of Colombia COL | Spanish: Colombia — República de Colombia | Bogotá / Santa Fe de Bogotá Spanish: Bogotá | 51,516,562 | 1,138,910 km^{2} (439,736 sq mi) | Colombian peso |
| Flag of Ecuador | Map showing Ecuador | Ecuador Republic of Ecuador ECU | Spanish: Ecuador — República del Ecuador Quechua: Ikwadur — Ikwadur Ripuwlika | Quito Spanish: Quito | 17,797,737 | 283,561 km^{2} (109,484 sq mi) | United States dollar |
| Flag of Guyana | Map showing Guyana | Guyana Co-operative Republic of Guyana GUY | English: Guyana — Co-operative Republic of Guyana | Georgetown English: Georgetown | 804,567 | 214,969 km^{2} (83,000 sq mi) | Guyanese dollar |
| Flag of Paraguay | Map showing Paraguay | Paraguay Republic of Paraguay PRY | Spanish: Paraguay — República del Paraguay Guarani: Paraguai — Tetã Paraguai | Asunción Spanish: Asunción | 6,109,903 | 406,752 km^{2} (157,048 sq mi) | Paraguayan guaraní |
| Flag of Peru | Map showing Peru | Peru Republic of Peru PER | Spanish: Perú — República del Perú Quechua: Piruw — Piruw Ripuwlika Aymara: Piruw — Piruwxa Ripuwlika | Lima Spanish: Lima | 33,715,471 | 1,285,216 km^{2} (496,225 sq mi) | Peruvian sol |
| Flag of Suriname | Map showing Suriname | Suriname Republic of Suriname SUR | Dutch: Suriname — Republiek Suriname | Paramaribo Dutch: Paramaribo | 612,985 | 163,820 km^{2} (63,251 sq mi) | Surinamese dollar |
| Flag of Uruguay | Map showing Uruguay | Uruguay Eastern Republic of Uruguay (Note: Also translated as "Oriental Republic of Uruguay".) URY | Spanish: Uruguay — República Oriental del Uruguay Portuguese: Uruguai — República Oriental do Uruguai | Montevideo Spanish: Montevideo Portuguese: Montevidéu | 3,426,260 | 176,215 km^{2} (68,037 sq mi) | Uruguayan peso |
| Flag of Venezuela | Map showing Venezuela | Venezuela Bolivarian Republic of Venezuela VEN | Spanish: Venezuela — República Bolivariana de Venezuela | Caracas Spanish: Caracas | 28,199,867 | 912,050 km^{2} (352,144 sq mi) | Venezuelan bolívar |

== Non-sovereign territories ==
=== External territories ===
| Flag | Map | English name | Legal status | Domestic name | Capital | Population | Area |
|---|---|---|---|---|---|---|---|
| Flag of the Falkland Islands | Map showing the Falkland Islands | Falkland Islands FLK | British overseas territory | English: Falkland Islands; Spanish: Islas Malvinas | Stanley English: Stanley | 3,398 | 12,173 km^{2} (4,700 sq mi) |
| South Georgia and the South Sandwich Islands | Map showing South Georgia and the South Sandwich Islands | South Georgia and the South Sandwich Islands (Note: Sometimes grouped with Antarctica rather than South America.) SGS | British overseas territory | English: South Georgia and the South Sandwich Islands | King Edward Point English: King Edward Point | No permanent population (Note: Present inhabitants are the British Government officer, deputy postmaster, scientists, and support staff from the British Antarctic Survey who maintain scientific bases on Bird Island and in the capital, King Edward Point, as well as museum staff at Grytviken.) | 3,903 km^{2} (1,507 sq mi) |

=== Internal territory ===
| Flag | Map | English name and ISO code | Legal status | Domestic name | Capital | Population | Area |
|---|---|---|---|---|---|---|---|
| The flag of the France, as used in French Guiana | Map showing French Guiana | French Guiana GUF | Overseas department, region and single territorial collectivity of France and outermost region of the European Union (Note: The territory has been fully integrated into the French central state.) | French: Guyane | Cayenne French: Cayenne | 294,071 | 83,534 km^{2} (32,253 sq mi) |

== Economic statistics ==
| Country/Territory | Currency | GDP (PPP) per capita (Note: The CIA's estimate for GDP per capita (PPP) is used in the article. For the World Bank and International Monetary Fund's estimates, see List of countries by GDP (PPP) per capita.) (2008 est. in U.S. dollars) | Notes |
|---|---|---|---|
| Argentina | Argentine peso | 14,200 | |
| Bolivia | Boliviano | 4,500 | |
| Brazil | Brazilian real | 10,100 | |
| Chile | Chilean peso | 14,900 | |
| Colombia | Colombian peso | 8,900 | |
| Ecuador | United States dollar | 7,500 | |
| Falkland Islands (United Kingdom) | Falkland Islands pound | 35,400 (2002 est.) | |
| French Guiana (France) | Euro | 6,000 (2001 est.) | |
| Guyana | Guyanese dollar | 3,900 | |
| Paraguay | Paraguayan guaraní | 4,200 | |
| Peru | Peruvian sol | 8,400 | |
| South Georgia and the South; Sandwich Islands^{†} (United Kingdom) | Falkland Islands Pound | 0 | |
| Suriname | Surinamese dollar | 8,900 | |
| Uruguay | Uruguayan peso | 12,200 | |
| Venezuela | Venezuelan bolívar | 13,500 | |

^{†} Geographically associated with Antarctica, but due to geopolitical reasons, the United Nations geoscheme has included South Georgia and the South Sandwich Islands in South America instead.

== See also ==
- List of South American countries by population
- List of South American countries by GDP per capita
- List of South American countries by GDP (PPP)
- List of predecessors of sovereign states in South America
- List of sovereign states and dependent territories in the Americas
