= 1917 Uruguayan constitutional referendum =

A constitutional referendum was held in Uruguay on 25 November 1917. Amongst the changes to the system of government, the new constitution would create a National Council of Administration (known as the colegiado) alongside the presidency. The National Council of Administration would have nine members; six from the winning party and three from the runner-up party. The proposals were approved by 95% of voters. The result was confirmed by the Senate on 18 December, and the new constitution came into force on 1 March 1919.

== Background ==
The colegiado system had been first proposed by President José Batlle y Ordóñez in 1913, with the aim of creating an executive body similar to the Swiss Federal Council. Batlle had been opposed to the presidential system, believing that a collegiate body would lower the risk of a dictatorship emerging. Although the proposal was defeated in 1916, Batlle negotiated a compromise with the National Party to include the system in a new constitution.

== New constitution ==
As well as introducing the colegiado system, the new constitution determined that presidents could only serve a single term in office. It provided for a bicameral General Assembly with a term of four years, and introduced universal male suffrage. It also provided for the separation of church and state and allowed for constitutional amendments to be made with a two-thirds majority in both chambers of the General Assembly.

== Results ==
| Choice | Votes | % |
|---|---|---|
| For | 86,610 | 95.31 |
| Against | 4,264 | 4.69 |
| Total | 90,874 | 100.00 |
| Registered voters/turnout | 223,879 | – |
Source: Bottinelli et al.

== See also ==
- Uruguayan Constitution
