= Creole nationalism =

Latin American political ideology

The term Creole nationalism or Criollo nationalism refers to the ideology that emerged in independence movements among the Criollos (descendants of the European colonizers), especially in Latin America in the early 19th century. Creole nationalists wanted an end to control by European powers. That goal was facilitated when the French Emperor Napoleon seized control of much of Spain and Portugal (1807–1814), breaking the chain of control from the Spanish and Portuguese kings to the local governors. The colonies rejected allegiance to Napoleonic metropoles, and increasingly the creoles demanded independence. They sought to overthrow the "peninsulares" – the temporary officials sent from the motherlands to impose control. They achieved independence in the course of civil wars between 1808 and 1826.

Historian Joshua Simon argues:

"the Creoles enjoyed many privileges, benefiting in particular from the economic exploitation and political exclusion of the large Indigenous, African, and mixed-race populations... However, as the American subjects of European empires, Creoles were socially marginalized, denied equal representation in metropolitan councils and parliaments, and subjected to commercial policies designed to advance imperial interests at the colonies' expense."

Consequently, Creole nationalists sought independent nationhood under Creole control. They typically did not give weight to the native or mixed-race peoples who comprised the great majority of the population in most Latin-American colonies. In Indonesia, however, the Creole movement was closer to the indigenous Indonesian element than it was to the European-born.

In Mexico in 1813 at the Congress of Chilpancingo the promulgation of the first Mexican Declaration of Independence expressed the sentiments of Creole nationalism. According to historian D. A. Brading, "Creole patriotism, which began as the articulation of the social identity of American Spaniards, was transmuted into the insurgent ideology of Mexican nationalism." After independence, Creole nationalism deepened thanks to the expansion of the public sphere, the role of elections and political parties, increased availability of newspapers and pamphlets, and the emergence of a nationalistic middle-class which provided a highly supportive audience for imaginative projections of future national achievements. Utopian fiction became an especially popular tool.

Peruvians in the 1836–9 Peruvian–Bolivian Confederation expressed demands for Peruvian Creole nationalism. Nationalist sentiments were expressed through the anti-confederationist press, especially in the form of satiric poetry, short stories and utopian concepts. There was a heavy emphasis upon a glorified version of the Inca past while rejecting the Indian present. The nationalist, even racist rhetoric pulled together themes that had originated half a century earlier. This emotional rhetoric became the main expression of an ideology that has pervaded Peruvian history ever since. Indeed, the rhetoric climaxed in the 20th century, and it shows signs of crisis in the 21st century.

Although Creole nationalism did actively seek to separate themselves from Spanish peninsulares, the way in which it played out in Mexico and Peru greatly depended on the historical context of each state. Each movement embraced differing aspects in the use of indigenous symbols or tradition on the influence of political values expressed in Mexico and Peru. In Colonial Mexico, Aztec elites and influence did not have a lasting influence on Creole nationalism. This lack of influence stemmed from the line of succession in Aztec society, as it was not done by a generational line, rather it was decided by a group of noble families. So, once Mexico was conquered by the Spanish, the Aztecs struggled to identify leadership among themselves. As a result, a nationalist discourse could not be united and developed under a clear Aztec emperor. While in contrast, Incans in the conquered Peru were able to establish themselves organizations that allowed a stronger sense of national pride.

== See also ==
- Creole peoples
- Creolisation
- Decolonization
- Decolonization of the Americas
- Latin American wars of independence
- Solemn Act of the Declaration of Independence of Northern America
- Mexican War of Independence
- Constitution of Apatzingán
- Sentimientos de la Nación
- New Spain
