= Constitution of Uruguay of 1830 =

Constitutional Document

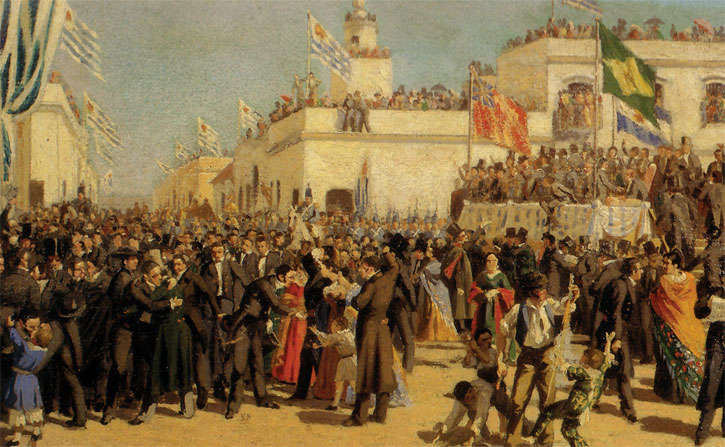
Boceto para la Jura de la Constitución de 1830, by Juan Manuel Blanes.

The first Constitution of Uruguay dates back to 1830. Drafted by the General Constituent Assembly, summoned in the Church of La Aguada in 1829, it was sworn by the citizens on 18 July 1830. The official name of the country was Oriental State of Uruguay.

This political constitution was in force until 1918, when it was replaced by a new constitutional text.

== Overview ==
The 1830 constitution has been regarded as Uruguay's most technically perfect charter. Heavily influenced by the thinking of the French and American revolutions, it divided the government among the executive, legislative, and judicial powers and established Uruguay as a unitary republic with a centralized form of government. The bicameral General Assembly was empowered to elect a president with considerable powers to head the executive branch for a four-year term. The president was given control over all of his ministers of government and was empowered to make decisions with the agreement of at least one of the three ministers recognized by the 1830 constitution.

Like all of Uruguay's charters since then, the 1830 constitution provided for a General Assembly composed of a Chamber of Senators (Cámara de Senadores), or Senate (Senado), elected nationally, and a Chamber of Representatives (Cámara de Representantes), elected from the departments. Members of the General Assembly were empowered to pass laws but lacked the authority to dismiss the president or his ministers or to issue votes of no confidence. An 1834 amendment, however, provided for juicio político, or impeachment, of the ministers for "unacceptable conduct".

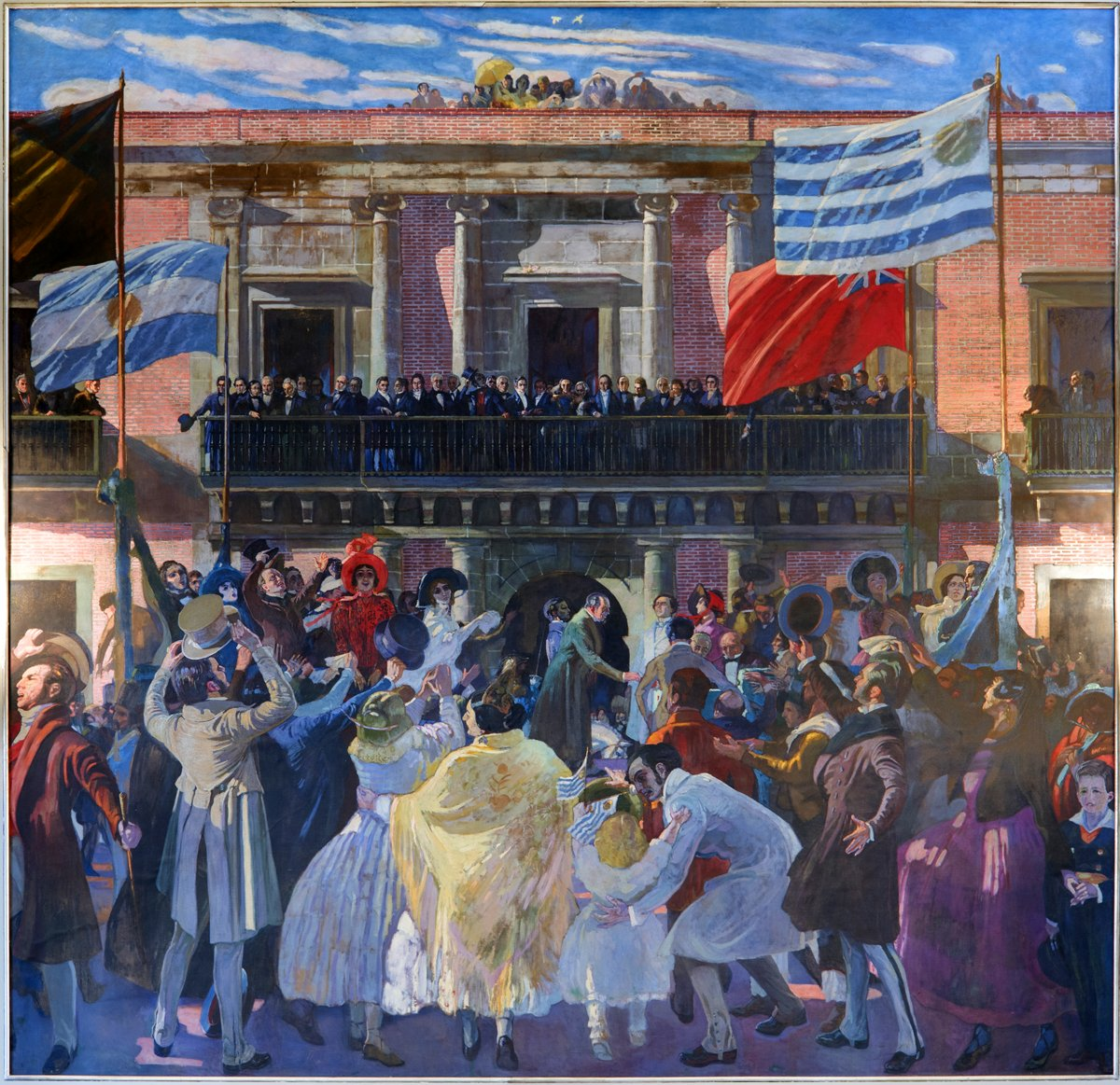
Proclamation of the Constitution of 1830

As established by the 1830 constitution, the Supreme Court of Justice, and lesser courts, exercised the judicial power. The General Assembly appointed the members of the high court. The latter – with the consent of the Senate in the case of the appellate courts – appointed the members of the lesser courts. The constitution also divided the country into departments, each headed by a governor appointed by the president and each having an advisory body called a Neighbors' Council (Consejo de Vecinos).

Although the 1830 constitution remained nominally in effect for eighty-seven years, it was actually too rigid to replace or modify. Successive de facto governments violated it repeatedly. In the 1878–90 period, the Blancos and Colorados, helped also by the Constitutional Party, initiated the framework for a more stable system through understandings called "pacts between the parties." This governing principle, called coparticipation (coparticipación), meaning the sharing of formal political and informal bureaucratic power, has been formally practiced since 1872.

== Memorials ==
- The anniversary of the 1830 promulgation of this original constitution on 18 July is a public holiday in Uruguay.
- Many squares in Uruguay bear the name of the Constitution, notably the Constitution Square in Montevideo.
- Many streets in different cities of Uruguay are named after the date of the First Constitutional Oath, notably 18 de Julio Avenue in Montevideo.
- The Centennial of 1830 was an occasion to celebrate a century of constitutional life; the Estadio Centenario was named after that anniversary.
- Also in the framework of the Centennial, the Obelisk of Montevideo was erected as a memorial to the First Constitution.

== Bibliography ==
- Nahum, Benjamín (1994). Manual de Historia del Uruguay 1830–1903. Montevideo: Ediciones de la Banda Oriental.
- Méndez Vives, Enrique (1990). Historia Uruguaya. Montevideo: Ediciones de la Banda Oriental.

== See also ==
- Treaty of Montevideo (1828)
- Constitution of Uruguay
