= Constitution of Uruguay =

Supreme law of Uruguay

The Constitution of Uruguay (Constitución de la República Oriental del Uruguay) is the supreme law of Uruguay. Its first version was written in 1830 and its last amendment was made in 2004.

Uruguay's first constitution was adopted in 1830, following the conclusion of the three-year-long Cisplatine War in which Argentina and Uruguay acted as a federation: the United Provinces of the Río de la Plata. Mediated by the United Kingdom, the 1828 Treaty of Montevideo allowed to build the foundations for a Uruguayan state and constitution. It has been reformed in 1918, 1934, 1942, 1952 and 1967, but it still maintains several articles from its first version of 1830.

== Versions ==
=== Original Constitution (1830 - 1918) ===
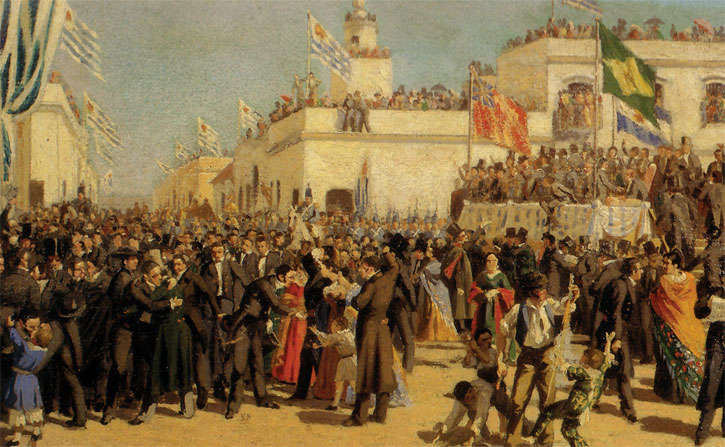
The 1830 Constitution of Uruguay coming into force

When it became independent on August 25, 1825, the Oriental State of Uruguay (Estado Oriental del Uruguay) was established. A General Constituent Assembly was summoned with the purpose of drafting the first constitution, which was enacted on 18 July 1830.This text has been regarded as Uruguay's most technically perfect charter. Heavily influenced by the thinking of the French and American revolutions, it divided the government among the executive, legislative, and judicial powers and established Uruguay as a unitary republic with a centralized form of government. The bicameral General Assembly (Asamblea General) was empowered to elect a president with considerable powers to head the executive branch for a four-year term. The president was given control over all of his ministers of government and was empowered to make decisions with the agreement of at least one of the three ministers recognized by the 1830 constitution.

Like all of Uruguay's charters since then, the 1830 constitution provided for a General Assembly composed of a Chamber of Senators (Cámara de Senadores), or Senate (Senado), elected nationally, and a Chamber of Representatives (Cámara de Representantes), elected from the departments. Members of the General Assembly were empowered to pass laws but lacked the authority to dismiss the president or his ministers or to issue votes of no confidence. An 1834 amendment, however, provided for juicio político, or impeachment, of the ministers for "unacceptable conduct".

As established by the 1830 constitution, the Supreme Court of Justice (Suprema Corte de Justicia), and lesser courts, exercised the judicial power. The General Assembly appointed the members of the high court. The latter – with the consent of the Senate in the case of the appellate courts – appointed the members of the lesser courts. The constitution also divided the country into departments, each headed by a governor appointed by the president and each having an advisory body called a Neighbors' Council (Consejo de Vecinos).

Although the 1830 constitution remained in effect for eighty-seven years, de facto governments violated it repeatedly. In the 1878-90 period, the Blancos and Colorados initiated the framework for a more stable system through understandings called "pacts between the parties." This governing principle, called coparticipation (coparticipación), meaning the sharing of formal political and informal bureaucratic power, has been formally practiced since 1872.

The anniversary of the 1830 enactment of this original constitution on July 18 is now a public holiday in Uruguay.

=== Second Constitution (1918 - 1934) ===
In 1913 President José Batlle y Ordóñez (1903–07, 1911–15), the father of modern Uruguay, proposed a constitutional reform involving the creation of a Swiss-style collegial executive system to be called the colegiado. A strong opponent of the one-person, powerful presidency, Batlle y Ordóñez believed that a collective executive power would neutralize the dictatorial intentions of political leaders. It met intense opposition, however, not only from the Blancos but also from members of his own Colorado Party. The proposal was defeated in 1916, but Batlle y Ordóñez worked out a deal with a faction of the Blancos whereby a compromise system was provided for in the second constitution, which was approved by a plebiscite on 25 November 1917.

The history of successive constitutions is one of a lengthy struggle between advocates of the collegial system and those of the presidential system. Although the 1917 constitution worked well during the prosperous time after World War I, recurring conflicts between the president and the colegiado members made the executive power ineffective in coping with the economic and social crises wracking the country. These conflicts eventually led to the presidential coup of 1933. The authorities suspended the constitution and appointed a constituent assembly to draw up a new one.

=== Third Constitution (1934 - 1942) ===
The 1934 constitution abolished the colegiado and transferred its power to the president. Nevertheless, presidential powers remained somewhat limited. The executive power once again was exercised by a president who had to make decisions together with the ministers. The 1934 charter established the Council of Ministers (Consejo de Ministros) as the body in which these decisions were to be made. This council consisted of the president and the cabinet ministers. The constitution required the chief executive to appoint three of the nine cabinet ministers from among the members of the political party that received the second largest number of votes in the presidential election. The General Assembly, for its part, could issue votes of no confidence in cabinet ministers, with the approval of two-thirds of its members.

The constitution divided the Senate between the Blancos and the Colorados or, as political scientist Martin Weinstein has pointed out, between the Herrerist faction of the Blancos (named after Luis Alberto de Herrera) and the Terrist wing of the Colorados (named after Gabriel Terra; president, 1931–38). The party that garnered the second largest number of votes automatically received 50 percent of the Senate seats. In addition, the 1934 charter empowered the Supreme Court of Justice to rule on the constitutionality of the laws. This system, which lasted eighteen years, further limited the power of the president and his government.

=== Fourth Constitution (1942 - 1951) ===
The fourth Constitution of Uruguay was in force between 1942 and 1952. It came to be because of President Alfredo Baldomir, who dissolved the General Assembly in February of 1942. It had several key changes from the 1934 Constitution. It abolished the mandatory coparticipation in ministries and the boards of states entities. It also terminated the arbitrary division of the Senate between the two poltitical factions which had been involved in the 1933 coup, instead replacing it with a system of election by strict proportional representation. It was submitted to a plebiscite and was approved by 77% of the electorate in November of 1942. The constitution was in force for a decade, until it was replaced by the Constitution of Uruguay of 1952.

=== Fifth Constitution (1951 - 1967) ===
On 13 July 1951, a formal pact between a fraction of the Colorados and the Herrerist Movement of the Blancos called for a plebiscite on constitutional reform. The plebiscite the following December 16 drew less than half of the 1.1 million voters to the polls, but the collegial system was approved by a small margin.

The fifth constitution was enacted on 25 January 1952 as the culmination of an effort to reestablish the colegiado and the plural executive power, the National Council of Government (Consejo Nacional de Gobierno), with six majority-party seats and three minority-party seats. This nine-member colegiado was ineffective because the president lacked control over the ministers and because the majority was seldom united. In the end, the ineffectiveness of these governments caused the public to turn against the colegiado arrangement.

=== Sixth Constitution (1967 - 1997) ===
In the elections of 27 November 1966, nearly 59 percent of Uruguayans voted to amend the 1952 constitution and to reestablish a presidential system of government, thus ending a fifteen-year experiment with the colegiado. The new constitution, which became operative on 15 February 1967, and has remained in effect since then, created a strong one-person presidency, subject to legislative and judicial checks. In free and fair elections, Uruguayans approved the new charter and elected the Colorado Party to power again.

During the presidential term of Jorge Pacheco Areco (1968–1972), a peculiar instrument was applied time after time, the prompt security measures (medidas prontas de seguridad). As a result, the country was in a sort of permanent state of emergency, which further deteriorated into authoritarianism. The next president, Juan María Bordaberry, faced huge challenges from the military which ultimately led to the 1973 coup d'état. The 1967 Constitution was suppressed during the civic-military dictatorship of Uruguay from 1973 to 1985.

==== Dictatorial period (1973-1985) ====
In 1976, the military government issued a series of constitutional decrees that intended to amend the 1967 constitution by creating the Council of the Nation (Consejo de la Nación) to serve as the supreme governmental body, with executive and legislative functions. It consisted of the thirty members of the Council of State (Consejo de Estado), the body created by the regime in June 1973 to act in lieu of the General Assembly, which was dissolved by the regime and the twenty-eight senior officers of the armed forces (sixteen from the army, six from the navy, and six from the air force). The Council of the Nation appointed the president of the republic and the members of the Council of State, the Supreme Court of Justice, and the Tribunal of Administrative Claims, which was later dissolved in 1985. Eight institutional acts substituted for many of the functional provisions and guarantees of the 1967 constitution. For example, in addition to giving the Council of the Nation the power to appoint the president of the republic and to set general policy for the country, institutional acts deprived previous officeholders and candidates of their political rights and permitted the arbitrary dismissal of public employees.

==== Back to institutionality ====
In 1985, Julio María Sanguinetti was sworn in as the new democratically elected president, after 12 years of dictatorship. The military question was tough to address; after much political bargaining, at the end of December was passed the Expiry Law, which constituted an amnesty of sorts for military people who had committed human-rights abuses. The constitutionality of this law was challenged, but ultimately the citizens backed the law in a plebiscite held in April 1989.

=== Current (1997 - present) ===
The 1967 Constitution is still in effect, though it was amended in 1989, 1994, 1996, and 2004. Though some consider the amendments of 1996 to have created a new constitution, Parliament continues to consider them changes to the Constitution of 1967.

The most important concepts that changed in 1996 were those related to elections. From 1999 onwards, the election cycle starts in June, with primary elections for all the parties, in order to choose single presidential candidates; in October, general elections are held, if no presidential candidate scores an absolute majority, a second round of voting is held in November; and finally, in May of the following year, municipal elections are held in all the Departments.

== See also ==
- Uruguay
- Politics of Uruguay
- Constitution
- Constitutional law
- Constitutional economics
- Constitutionalism
- Elections in Uruguay
