= Preliminary Peace Convention (1828) =

1828 recognition of Uruguayan independence by Brazil and Argentina

Treaty of Montevideo
Convención preliminar de paz entre el Gobierno de la República de las Provincias Unidas del Río de la Plata y Su Majestad el Emperador del Brasil
- Type: Bilateral treaty
- Signed: 27 August 1828
- Location: Rio de Janeiro, Empire of Brazil
- Ratified: 30 August 1828 by Empire of Brazil; 29 September 1828 by United Provinces of the Río de la Plata
- Effective: 4 October 1828
- Condition: Ratified by both parties. Exchange of ratifications took place in Montevideo.
- Mediators: John Ponsonby
- Original signatories: Juan Ramón Balcarce; Tomás Guido; Marquis of Aracati; José Clemente Pereira; Joaquim de Oliveira Álvares
- Parties: United Provinces of the Río de la Plata; Empire of Brazil
- Ratifiers: Manuel Dorrego, Governor of Buenos Aires; Pedro I, Emperor of Brazil
- Languages: Spanish and Portuguese

The Preliminary Peace Convention was a bilateral treaty signed on 27 August 1828 between the Empire of Brazil and the United Provinces of the Río de la Plata, after British mediation, that put an end to the Cisplatine War and recognized the independence of Uruguay.

Called the Preliminary Peace Convention as a result of the meetings held by representatives from the Empire of Brazil and the United Provinces — the predecessor state for Argentina — between 11 and 27 August 1828 in Rio de Janeiro, Brazil. This convention, or treaty, accorded independence to Uruguay in respect to Brazil and Argentina. Uruguay's independence would be definitively sealed on 4 October of the same year when, in Montevideo, the signing nations ratified the treaty.

== Purpose ==
By 1828 the Cisplatine War had been fought to a stalemate with Argentina's land forces unable to capture any major cities, and Brazil forces pinned down and with severe lack of manpower for a full-scale offensive against Argentine forces. The heavy burden of the war and the increasing unlikelihood of any positive outcome led to heavy public pressure in Brazil to end the war through diplomacy.

In this context, on 20 February 1828 Brazil and Argentina decided to begin peace talks with mediation by Great Britain, who also had an interest in a peaceful resolution of the war due to the severe trade impediments the blockade of Buenos Aires had brought to the Plata region.

Lord John Ponsonby was chosen as mediator for the talks and was immediately faced with Argentina's unwillingness to allow Brazil to retain its sovereignty over Uruguay and by Brazil's demands to keep its sovereignty over the Missões Orientais, to free navigation in the Plata River and refusal to allow Argentina to annex any area of the Cisplatine Province.

With these considerations in mind, Posonby made a proposal for an independent Uruguay to placate both Brazil and Argentina in order to reestablish peace on La Plata, and conceded to the Brazilian demands regarding its sovereignty over the Missões Orientais and the right to freely navigate in the Plata River.

Although faced with initial Argentine opposition, the diplomat managed to convince Argentina that it was no longer viable to spend money on a war for the Eastern Province and managed to strike a deal on August 27, 1828.

== Form of Declaration of Independence ==
The first and second articles of the treaty declare the independence of the Eastern Province from the United Kingdom of Portugal, Brazil, and the Algarves or its immediate successor, the Empire of Brazil, and from the United Provinces of the Río de la Plata.

== Character of Independence: Definitive or Temporary ==
The tenth article of the convention established that if five years after the approval of the constitution the interior tranquility and security was perturbed by a civil war, they (the signers) would give the legal government the necessary assistance to maintain and sustain itself. After that time all protection would cease and the province would be considered to be in a state of perfect and absolute independence. The right to intervene in assistance of the "legal government" was established by the contracting parties without need of express request on the part of the new state.

== Control of the Constitution ==
The seventh article establishes that the Representatives will be occupied with forming the political constitution of the province and before being judged (approved), the constitution would be examined by commissioners of the contracting governments for the sole purpose of seeing if it contained any articles in opposition to the security of their respective states.

== Free navigation ==
One additional article guaranteed to the two nations (Argentina and Brazil) free navigation of the Río de la Plata and of all others that feed into it, for the period of fifteen years.

== Historiography ==
Uruguayan historians have two main visions about the treaty and the birth of Uruguay as an independent nation. The first group considers that an idea of Uruguayan nationhood existed before the treaty, and cites the rivalry of Montevideo with Buenos Aires, the weak links that united the Viceroyalty of the Río de la Plata, and the strong rejection of José Gervasio Artigas of the centralism of Buenos Aires. This vision is held by Francisco Bauzá, Juan Zorrilla de San Martín, Pablo Blanco Acevedo, Mario Falcao Espalter and Juan Pivel Devoto. The second group considers instead that the Uruguayans still wanted to be part of the United Provinces of the Río de la Plata, pointing that Artigas was against centralism but never held actual separatist ideas. They attribute the Uruguayan independence to foreign factors, mainly the British influence. This vision is held by Eduardo Acevedo Vásquez, Ariosto González, Eugenio Petit Muñoz, Washington Reyes Abadie, Alberto Methol Ferré and Oscar Bruschera.

Historian Leonardo Borges argues that Independence Day, celebrated on August 25, does not reflect the actual birth of the nation. When the independence of the Brazilian Empire and the United Provinces of the Río de la Plata was signed on August 25, 1825, Uruguay remained part of Argentina, the Banda Oriental. Borges says that "[I]t seems like nonsense" to establish August 25 as Independence Day. Ana Ribeiro, Undersecretary of Education and Culture, argues that all such dates are arbitrary, and points out that Bastille Day does not celebrate the determining date of the French Revolution.

== See also ==
- Constitution of Uruguay of 1830
- General Constituent and Legislative Assembly of the Eastern State of Uruguay

== Bibliography ==
- Nahum, Benjamín (1994). Manual de Historia del Uruguay 1830-1903. Montevideo. Editorial De la Banda Oriental.
- Méndez Vives, Enrique (1990). Historia Uruguaya. Montevideo. Editorial De la Banda Oriental.
