= Viceroyalty =

Political entity headed by a viceroy

A viceroyalty was an entity headed by a viceroy. It dates back to the administration of the Spanish-held territories in Southern Italy from the early fifteenth century onwards, most notably by the year 1428, the term “vice rex” was used to refer the Viceroy of Sicily in the official documents of the Crown of Aragon, which in the sixteenth century it passed through Catalan as “visrei” to later pass to Spanish as “visorey”.

== British Empire ==
=== India ===
- India was governed by the Governor-General and Viceroy of India from 1858 to 1947, commonly shortened to "Viceroy of India".

=== Ireland ===
- Ireland was governed by the Lord Lieutenant of Ireland, who was the representative of the British Monarchy in Ireland from the Williamite period until independence, was also called the Viceroy of Ireland.

== France ==
- Viceroyalty of New France

== Portuguese Empire ==
In the scope of the Portuguese Empire, the term "Viceroyalty of Brazil" is also occasionally used to designate the colonial State of Brazil, in the historic period while its governors had the title of "Viceroy". Some of the governors of Portuguese India were also called "Viceroy".

- Viceroyalty of Brazil
- Governors of Portuguese India

== Russian Empire ==
- List of viceroyalties of the Russian Empire

== Spanish Empire ==
The viceroyalty (Spanish: virreinato) was a local, political, social, and administrative institution, created by the Spanish monarchy in the late fifteenth century, for ruling its possessions.

The administration over the vast territories of the Spanish Empire was carried out by viceroys, who became governors of an area, which was considered not as a colony but as a province of the empire, with the same rights as any other province in Peninsular Spain.

=== Europe ===
Name	Capital or main city	Dates	Later status
Viceroyalty of Aragon	Zaragoza	1517–1707	Integrated into the Kingdom of Spain
Viceroyalty of Catalonia	Barcelona	1520–1716	Integrated into the Kingdom of Spain
Viceroyalty of Galicia	Santiago de Compostela	1486–?	Integrated into the Kingdom of Spain
Viceroyalty of Majorca	Palma de Majorca	1520–1715	Integrated into the Kingdom of Spain
Viceroyalty of Naples	Naples	1504–1707	Ceded to Austria
Viceroyalty of Navarre	Pamplona	1512–1841	Integrated into the Kingdom of Spain
Viceroyalty of Portugal	Lisbon	1580–1640	Achieved independence as Portugal
Viceroyalty of Sardinia	Cagliari	1417–1714	Ceded to Austria
Viceroyalty of Sardinia	Cagliari	1717–1720	Ceded to Savoy
Viceroyalty of Sicily	Palermo	1415–1713	Ceded to Savoy
Viceroyalty of Valencia	Valencia	1520–1707	Integrated into the Kingdom of Spain

=== America and Asia ===
Name	Capital or main city	Dates	Later status
Viceroyalty of New Granada	Santa Fe de Bogotá	1717–1723	Integrated into Peru
Viceroyalty of New Granada	Santa Fe de Bogotá	1739–1810	Achieved independence as New Granada
Viceroyalty of New Granada	Santa Fe de Bogotá	1815–1822	Achieved independence as Colombia
Viceroyalty of New Spain	Mexico City	1535–1821	Achieved independence as Mexico
Viceroyalty of Peru	Lima	1542–1824	Achieved independence as Peru
Viceroyalty of the Río de la Plata	Buenos Aires	1776–1810	Achieved independence as Argentina
Viceroyalty of the Indies	Santo Domingo	1492–1535	Became the Viceroyalty of New Spain

==== Controversy over whether the American Viceroyalties were Colonies or Provinces ====
According to the lawyer Fernando de Trazegnies, the status of the Viceroyalties was like that of a Kingdom among the Kingdoms of the Indies, and that the fact that legal Pluralism was practiced in Derecho Indiano would be sufficient proof that the Crown did not seek to practice a Exploitative colonialism (where local institutions, which protect the socioeconomic rights of the Vassal people, are ignored, under the excuse of the Right of Conquest), if not political integration into the Hispanic Monarchy in the same plural way that had already been done with the rest of its territories in Europe, based on the characteristic Fueros of the traditional and composite Monarchy that maintained the regional laws of each nation integrated into the Spanish Monarchy (and that was even practiced within peninsular Spain after the Reconquista, such as the Fueros of Aragón or the Fueros of Navarra). This would be evidenced by the creation of the República de Indios in which the political traditions of indigenous customary law would remain alive as a state within the several states that made up the Composite Monarchy, or the desire of the Spanish conquistadors to make pacts with the Natural Lords of the new lands (indigenous nobility and chiefs) to legitimize the conquest in natural law and integrate them into the seigneurial system, respecting the sovereignty of the natives and their ethnic lordships, which could not be deprived of their rights and was only possible its annexation to the Spanish Empire through alliance pacts (whose conditions of such pacts had to include the part of the indigenous sovereign, protector of the common Indian).

"However, although there was only one Crown, the diversity of the kingdoms was maintained, with their own jurisdictions, with their national law. So, when taking possession of America, the Crown of Castile proceeded in a similar way as in Spain for manage diversity; and this is how he recognizes two great kingdoms: that of New Spain (today Mexico) and that of New Castilla (today Peru). And his first reaction is to govern them in the same plural form as in Spain, that is, integrating local customs and authorities within a larger political perspective represented by the Crown of Castile (...) aims to create two “republics” under the same Crown: the “republic of Spaniards” and the “republic of Indians”, each with their own authorities and rules, although both subject to the mandates of the Crown. As it was evident that the Spanish King could not personally govern such distant towns and territories, he established that such kingdoms are Viceroyalties, that is, political spaces with their own identity that are in charge of a personal representative of the Monarch, who was the Viceroy. This was not an oppressive political form that placed the people governed by the Viceroy in inferior conditions. Nor is it an invention specially designed to subdue the American Indians. Viceroyalties exist in Europe and the Spanish Crown itself has governed some of the different Hispanic kingdoms in this way; Thus, Valencia and Naples were viceroyalties of Aragon and, after the annexation of Navarre to the Crown of Castile, it remained as a viceroyalty (...) It is not surprising then that this new dynasty, known as the Austrias, used a pluralistic imperial model also to annex the new lands of America. On the other hand, the Papal Bull itself, which granted the Catholic Monarchs the dominion of these new lands, established the Supreme and Universal Principality for the Crown of Castile, but did not deprive the kings and natural lords of the Indies of their lordships."

— Fernando de Trazegnies

At the same time, the Spanish Empire itself and the Council of the Indies did not perceive the American Viceroyalties as possessions analogous to the Factories or administrative Colonies, in the style of other empires with a more Mercantilist behavior towards the Natives of their non-European possessions, but rather perceived the Viceroyalties as overseas Provinces, with rights equivalent in hierarchy to those of the rest of the provinces of the Crown of Castile (according to the Laws of the Indies), of which they were an integral part. Even the word colony would not have been used in any legal document of the Spanish Monarchy with respect to the Indies until the 17th century, and after the arrival of the Bourbons it would be used in reference to its classic etymological sense of human settlements established in new territories, and not in the modern sense with connotations of economic exploitation.

That would be reaffirmed in the late empire by official statements of the Supreme Central Junta (legal representative of occupied Spain in the middle of the Peninsular War).

"Considering that the vast and precious dominions that Spain possesses in the Indies are not properly colonies or factories like those of other nations, but rather an essential and integral part of the Spanish monarchy..., His Majesty has been pleased to declare... that the kingdoms, provinces and Islands that form the aforementioned domains must have immediate national representation in their royal person and constitute part of the Central Board... through their corresponding deputies. For this royal resolution to take effect, they must appoint the Viceroyalties of New Spain, Peru, New Reyno de Granada and Buenos Aires, and the independent General Captaincies of the island of Cuba, Puerto Rico, Guatemala, Chile, the Province of Venezuela and the Philippines, one individual each representing their respective district."

— «Real Orden de la Junta Central expedida el 22 de enero de 1809»

Such statements would not have been questioned by American representatives in the Cortes of Cádiz, such as the Peruvian Vicente Morales Duárez.

"America since the conquest and its indigenous people have enjoyed the privileges of Castile. Listen to the words with which a chapter of the titled laws of the year 1542 ends, where the Emperor Charles thus speaks: -we want and command that the Indians be treated as vassals ours from Castile, since they are. With respect to this justice, he had previously made a declaration in Barcelona in September 1529 that gave merit to Law 1. Title 1, of book 3 of the Compilation of the Indies, where it is said that the Americas are incorporated and united to the Crown of Castile, in accordance with the intentions of Pope Alexander VI. It must be noted in those words incorporated and united, to understand that the provinces of America have not been and are not slaves or vassals of the provinces of Spain; they have been and are like provinces of Castile, with the same privileges and honors."

— Vicente Morales Duárez

However, there would still be historiographical debates in this regard, among those (the nationalist or colonialist school) who say that this was only De jure positions on paper, and not a De facto reality in social dynamics (the revisionist school). Authors such as Annick Lempérière consider that the “colonial” concept in Hispanic reality would have been an anachronistic concept that serves mostly an ideological use by historians (wanting to develop an idyllic vision of Spanish-American Independence) rather than to make a scientific description of the history of the Spanish empire, going so far as to question its apparent “objective” usefulness that modern historiography gave to the colonial concept to relate it to the causes of the Spanish-American Wars of Independence (that is, that there is an artificial consensus that American social formations, the Reinos de Indias and it's viceroyalties, have been institutionally formed for their economic exploitation and dependence on the metropolis, instead of being an integral part of the Empire like any extension of the Crown, just like its European dominions).

"Lempérière points out that from the first dates of the arrival of Europeans to America until – at least – the beginning of the 19th century, the term “colony” means – following the ancient Roman convention – a settlement that is established outside its political community. Colonize, writes Lempérière, means "above all to populate; a migration and a foundation that did not imply the domination of one people over another, but rather the taking possession of a territory" (2004c: 114). This vision of populations that are extensions of the European matrix would have facilitated, in part, the evolution of an institutionality and legal body in which the American provinces were an integral part of the Spanish Crown. At the same time, this institutionality corresponded to an adhesion that was not imposed nor the result of the military strength of the Crown, but of the common involvement in the monarchical, Catholic, corporatist and pactist ideology, in short, a sincere belonging for a long time elaborated and that had the participation of broad social sectors, from the Creoles to castes and indigenous people (...) Therefore, it is more appropriate to compare New Granada with Aragon or even Naples than with Haiti, the British possessions in the Caribbean or, what is considered even more misguided, with colonial domination imposed by England on India at the end of the 18th century. For Lempérière, the process of decisive fragmentation of that Hispanic community after 1810 will be a consequence of an unexpected situation – the crisis of legitimacy that emanates from the vacatio regis and the Napoleonic invasion of 1808. Even more, he will say following François Guerra, the initial reaction, unanimous and identical on both sides of the Atlantic, will be to swear loyalty to the King (Guerra, 1993 and 2005). At no time did the Americans, Creoles or other classes, in 1808 present themselves as colonized subjects confronted in a struggle for national liberation. And, in this way, for Guerra and Lempérière it cannot be said that there was a local social ferment that promoted and made the break with Spain inevitable."

— Francisco Ortega

== See also ==
- Viceroy
