= List of South American regions by life expectancy =

This is a list of South American regions according to estimation of the Global Data Lab, as of 15 October 2024. By default, regions within country are sorted by overall life expectancy in 2022. Countries are sorted by the most favorable for life expectancy region inside them.

country or special territory	region	2019				2019 →2021	2021	2021 →2022	2022				2019 →2022
country or special territory	region	overall	male	female	F Δ M	2019 →2021	overall	2021 →2022	overall	male	female	F Δ M	2019 →2022
Chile	Atacama	82.09	79.58	84.79	5.21	−1.41	80.68	0.59	81.27	78.83	83.93	5.10	−0.82
Chile	Coquimbo	81.12	78.65	83.64	4.99	−1.40	79.72	0.58	80.30	77.90	82.80	4.90	−0.82
Chile	Tarapacá (inc. Arica and Parinacota)	81.05	78.58	83.56	4.98	−1.40	79.65	0.58	80.23	77.84	82.72	4.88	−0.82
Chile	O'Higgins	80.77	78.32	83.23	4.91	−1.39	79.38	0.57	79.95	77.57	82.39	4.82	−0.82
Chile	Valparaíso	80.62	78.18	83.06	4.88	−1.39	79.23	0.58	79.81	77.44	82.22	4.78	−0.81
Chile	Biobío	80.60	78.16	83.03	4.87	−1.39	79.21	0.58	79.79	77.42	82.20	4.78	−0.81
Chile	Santiago Metropolitan Region	80.53	78.09	82.96	4.87	−1.38	79.15	0.58	79.73	77.35	82.12	4.77	−0.80
Chile	Los Lagos (inc. Los Ríos)	80.17	77.74	82.52	4.78	−1.38	78.79	0.57	79.36	77.01	81.69	4.68	−0.81
Chile	Aysén	80.09	77.67	82.43	4.76	−1.38	78.71	0.57	79.28	76.93	81.60	4.67	−0.81
Chile	Magallanes and Antártica Chilena	79.42	77.02	81.64	4.62	−1.37	78.05	0.57	78.62	76.29	80.82	4.53	−0.80
Chile	Araucanía	79.23	76.83	81.41	4.58	−1.37	77.86	0.57	78.43	76.11	80.59	4.48	−0.80
Chile	Maule	79.05	76.66	81.20	4.54	−1.36	77.69	0.57	78.26	75.94	80.38	4.44	−0.79
Chile	Antofagasta	78.37	76.01	80.40	4.39	−1.35	77.02	0.57	77.59	75.29	79.59	4.30	−0.78
France	French Guiana	78.14	75.04	81.36	6.32	−0.94	77.20	2.16	79.36	76.12	82.67	6.55	1.22
Uruguay	—	77.51	73.58	81.30	7.72	−2.07	75.44	2.56	78.00	74.15	81.69	7.54	0.49
Ecuador	—	77.30	74.70	79.95	5.25	−3.63	73.67	4.22	77.89	75.31	80.48	5.17	0.59
Argentina	—	77.28	73.86	80.68	6.82	−1.89	75.39	0.67	76.06	72.85	79.28	6.43	−1.22
Brazil	Federal District (inc. Brasília)	77.89	74.58	81.50	6.92	−2.68	75.21	0.70	75.91	72.61	79.55	6.94	−1.98
Brazil	Roraima	77.72	74.43	81.31	6.88	−2.67	75.05	0.70	75.75	72.46	79.37	6.91	−1.97
Brazil	Rio de Janeiro	77.05	73.80	80.51	6.71	−2.65	74.40	0.69	75.09	71.85	78.59	6.74	−1.96
Brazil	São Paulo	76.65	73.43	80.04	6.61	−2.63	74.02	0.69	74.71	71.49	78.13	6.64	−1.94
Brazil	Rio Grande do Sul	76.30	73.10	79.61	6.51	−2.63	73.67	0.69	74.36	71.17	77.71	6.54	−1.94
Brazil	Santa Catarina	76.29	73.09	79.60	6.51	−2.62	73.67	0.68	74.35	71.16	77.70	6.54	−1.94
Brazil	Mato Grosso	75.93	72.76	79.17	6.41	−2.61	73.32	0.68	74.00	70.83	77.28	6.45	−1.93
Brazil	Goiás	75.91	72.74	79.15	6.41	−2.61	73.30	0.68	73.98	70.82	77.26	6.44	−1.93
Brazil	Tocantins	75.87	72.70	79.11	6.41	−2.60	73.27	0.68	73.95	70.78	77.22	6.44	−1.92
Brazil	Minas Gerais	75.83	72.66	79.05	6.39	−2.61	73.22	0.68	73.90	70.74	77.17	6.43	−1.93
Brazil	Rondônia	75.74	72.58	78.95	6.37	−2.60	73.14	0.68	73.82	70.66	77.07	6.41	−1.92
Brazil	Paraná	75.63	72.48	78.82	6.34	−2.59	73.04	0.67	73.71	70.57	76.94	6.37	−1.92
Brazil	Amapá	75.48	72.34	78.64	6.30	−2.59	72.89	0.68	73.57	70.43	76.76	6.33	−1.91
Brazil	Mato Grosso do Sul	75.44	72.30	78.59	6.29	−2.59	72.85	0.68	73.53	70.39	76.72	6.33	−1.91
Brazil	Amazonas	75.34	72.21	78.48	6.27	−2.58	72.76	0.67	73.43	70.30	76.60	6.30	−1.91
Brazil	Espírito Santo	75.16	72.04	78.26	6.22	−2.58	72.58	0.67	73.25	70.13	76.39	6.26	−1.91
Brazil	Ceará	75.14	72.02	78.23	6.21	−2.58	72.56	0.67	73.23	70.12	76.37	6.25	−1.91
Brazil	Sergipe	74.61	71.51	77.59	6.08	−2.57	72.04	0.67	72.71	69.63	75.74	6.11	−1.90
Brazil	Rio Grande do Norte	74.45	71.37	77.41	6.04	−2.55	71.90	0.66	72.56	69.49	75.56	6.07	−1.89
Brazil	Pará	74.41	71.33	77.36	6.03	−2.55	71.86	0.66	72.52	69.45	75.52	6.07	−1.89
Brazil	Paraíba	74.40	71.32	77.34	6.02	−2.56	71.84	0.67	72.51	69.43	75.50	6.07	−1.89
Brazil	Acre	74.30	71.22	77.22	6.00	−2.56	71.74	0.67	72.41	69.34	75.38	6.04	−1.89
Brazil	Bahia	74.26	71.19	77.18	5.99	−2.55	71.71	0.66	72.37	69.31	75.34	6.03	−1.89
Brazil	Pernambuco	74.21	71.14	77.12	5.98	−2.55	71.66	0.67	72.33	69.26	75.28	6.02	−1.88
Brazil	Maranhão	73.37	70.35	76.12	5.77	−2.52	70.85	0.66	71.51	68.49	74.30	5.81	−1.86
Brazil	Alagoas	73.33	70.31	76.06	5.75	−2.52	70.81	0.66	71.47	68.45	74.25	5.80	−1.86
Brazil	Piauí	72.04	69.08	74.51	5.43	−2.48	69.56	0.65	70.21	67.25	72.73	5.48	−1.83
Colombia	Meta	79.02	75.92	82.42	6.50	−4.04	74.98	0.86	75.84	72.33	79.75	7.42	−3.18
Colombia	Caldas	78.34	75.28	81.61	6.33	−4.00	74.34	0.84	75.18	71.73	78.97	7.24	−3.16
Colombia	Cundinamarca	78.14	75.09	81.37	6.28	−4.00	74.14	0.85	74.99	71.55	78.74	7.19	−3.15
Colombia	Sucre	77.95	74.92	81.15	6.23	−3.98	73.97	0.84	74.81	71.39	78.53	7.14	−3.14
Colombia	Quindio	77.77	74.75	80.94	6.19	−3.97	73.80	0.84	74.64	71.23	78.32	7.09	−3.13
Colombia	Valle (inc. Cali)	77.67	74.66	80.82	6.16	−3.97	73.70	0.84	74.54	71.14	78.20	7.06	−3.13
Colombia	Casanare	77.48	74.48	80.58	6.10	−3.96	73.52	0.83	74.35	70.96	77.98	7.02	−3.13
Colombia	Boyaca	77.37	74.38	80.46	6.08	−3.95	73.42	0.84	74.26	70.87	77.86	6.99	−3.11
Colombia	Risaralda	77.36	74.37	80.45	6.08	−3.95	73.41	0.83	74.24	70.86	77.85	6.99	−3.12
Colombia	Bolivar (Sur and Norte)	77.29	74.30	80.36	6.06	−3.95	73.34	0.84	74.18	70.80	77.76	6.96	−3.11
Colombia	Vichada	77.27	74.28	80.33	6.05	−3.95	73.32	0.83	74.15	70.78	77.74	6.96	−3.12
Colombia	Bogota D.C.	77.23	74.25	80.29	6.04	−3.94	73.29	0.83	74.12	70.75	77.70	6.95	−3.11
Colombia	Antioquia (inc. Medellin)	77.19	74.21	80.25	6.04	−3.94	73.25	0.83	74.08	70.71	77.65	6.94	−3.11
Colombia	Guainja	77.15	74.18	80.20	6.02	−3.94	73.21	0.83	74.04	70.68	77.61	6.93	−3.11
Colombia	Huila	77.12	74.14	80.16	6.02	−3.94	73.18	0.83	74.01	70.65	77.57	6.92	−3.11
Colombia	Tolima	77.10	74.12	80.13	6.01	−3.94	73.16	0.83	73.99	70.63	77.54	6.91	−3.11
Colombia	San Andres	77.07	74.09	80.09	6.00	−3.94	73.13	0.83	73.96	70.60	77.50	6.90	−3.11
Colombia	Guaviare	77.05	74.08	80.08	6.00	−3.94	73.11	0.84	73.95	70.59	77.49	6.90	−3.10
Colombia	Santander	76.86	73.90	79.85	5.95	−3.93	72.93	0.83	73.76	70.41	77.27	6.86	−3.10
Colombia	Caqueta	76.83	73.87	79.81	5.94	−3.93	72.90	0.83	73.73	70.39	77.23	6.84	−3.10
Colombia	Narino	76.66	73.72	79.62	5.90	−3.91	72.75	0.83	73.58	70.24	77.04	6.80	−3.08
Colombia	Atlantico (inc. Barranquilla)	76.57	73.63	79.51	5.88	−3.91	72.66	0.83	73.49	70.16	76.94	6.78	−3.08
Colombia	Cordoba	76.41	73.48	79.32	5.84	−3.90	72.51	0.82	73.33	70.02	76.75	6.73	−3.08
Colombia	Cauca	76.04	73.13	78.87	5.74	−3.88	72.16	0.82	72.98	69.68	76.32	6.64	−3.06
Colombia	Norte de Santander	76.04	73.13	78.87	5.74	−3.88	72.16	0.82	72.98	69.68	76.32	6.64	−3.06
Colombia	Arauca	75.98	73.07	78.79	5.72	−3.89	72.09	0.82	72.91	69.62	76.25	6.63	−3.07
Colombia	Magdalena	75.53	72.65	78.26	5.61	−3.86	71.67	0.82	72.49	69.22	75.73	6.51	−3.04
Colombia	Cesar	75.27	72.41	77.95	5.54	−3.84	71.43	0.81	72.24	68.99	75.43	6.44	−3.03
Colombia	Choco	74.08	71.28	76.52	5.24	−3.78	70.30	0.80	71.10	67.91	74.05	6.14	−2.98
Colombia	Putumayo	73.81	71.01	76.19	5.18	−3.78	70.03	0.80	70.83	67.66	73.72	6.06	−2.98
Colombia	Amazonas	73.48	70.70	75.79	5.09	−3.76	69.72	0.80	70.52	67.36	73.34	5.98	−2.96
Colombia	Vaupis	70.96	68.26	72.73	4.47	−3.63	67.33	0.77	68.10	65.04	70.38	5.34	−2.86
Colombia	Guajira	70.12	67.45	71.71	4.26	−3.58	66.54	0.76	67.30	64.26	69.39	5.13	−2.82
Peru	West (Ancash, Lima, Callao)	77.30	74.99	79.86	4.87	−3.83	73.47	1.02	74.49	72.38	76.80	4.42	−2.81
Peru	South (Tacna, Moquegua, Arequipa, Ica, Ayacucho)	77.15	74.85	79.67	4.82	−3.83	73.32	1.02	74.34	72.24	76.63	4.39	−2.81
Peru	North (Tumbes, Piura, Lambayeque, Cajamarca, La Libertad)	76.56	74.29	78.98	4.69	−3.80	72.76	1.02	73.78	71.71	75.96	4.25	−2.78
Peru	Central (Huancavelica, Huanuco, Junin, Pasco)	75.29	73.08	77.47	4.39	−3.74	71.55	1.00	72.55	70.53	74.50	3.97	−2.74
Peru	North East (Amazonas, Loreto, San Martin, Ucayali)	74.21	72.04	76.18	4.14	−3.68	70.53	0.98	71.51	69.53	73.27	3.74	−2.70
Peru	East (Madre de Dios, Cusco, Puno, Apurimac)	74.11	71.94	76.06	4.12	−3.67	70.44	0.98	71.42	69.44	73.15	3.71	−2.69
Venezuela	Vargas	74.10	69.84	78.93	9.09	−1.65	72.45	0.57	73.02	68.65	77.99	9.34	−1.08
Venezuela	Anzoategui	73.51	69.30	78.21	8.91	−1.63	71.88	0.56	72.44	68.12	77.28	9.16	−1.07
Venezuela	Aragua	73.37	69.17	78.04	8.87	−1.63	71.74	0.56	72.30	67.99	77.11	9.12	−1.07
Venezuela	Tachira	72.85	68.68	77.41	8.73	−1.62	71.23	0.56	71.79	67.51	76.49	8.98	−1.06
Venezuela	Falcon	72.80	68.63	77.34	8.71	−1.63	71.17	0.56	71.73	67.46	76.42	8.96	−1.07
Venezuela	Nueva Esparta	72.75	68.59	77.28	8.69	−1.62	71.13	0.56	71.69	67.42	76.36	8.94	−1.06
Venezuela	Carabobo	72.74	68.58	77.27	8.69	−1.62	71.12	0.55	71.67	67.41	76.35	8.94	−1.07
Venezuela	Apure	72.65	68.49	77.16	8.67	−1.62	71.03	0.56	71.59	67.33	76.25	8.92	−1.06
Venezuela	Guarico	72.60	68.44	77.10	8.66	−1.62	70.98	0.55	71.53	67.28	76.18	8.90	−1.07
Venezuela	Amacuros Delta Federal Territory	72.59	68.44	77.09	8.65	−1.62	70.97	0.56	71.53	67.27	76.17	8.90	−1.06
Venezuela	Trujillo	72.44	68.29	76.90	8.61	−1.62	70.82	0.56	71.38	67.13	75.99	8.86	−1.06
Venezuela	Miranda	72.26	68.12	76.68	8.56	−1.61	70.65	0.55	71.20	66.96	75.77	8.81	−1.06
Venezuela	Federal District	72.12	68.00	76.52	8.52	−1.60	70.52	0.55	71.07	66.84	75.61	8.77	−1.05
Venezuela	Monagas	72.09	67.97	76.48	8.51	−1.60	70.49	0.55	71.04	66.81	75.57	8.76	−1.05
Venezuela	Bolivar	72.04	67.92	76.42	8.50	−1.60	70.44	0.55	70.99	66.77	75.51	8.74	−1.05
Venezuela	Barinas	71.91	67.80	76.26	8.46	−1.60	70.31	0.55	70.86	66.64	75.35	8.71	−1.05
Venezuela	Sucre	71.90	67.79	76.25	8.46	−1.60	70.30	0.55	70.85	66.63	75.34	8.71	−1.05
Venezuela	Mérida	71.70	67.60	76.01	8.41	−1.59	70.11	0.54	70.65	66.45	75.10	8.65	−1.05
Venezuela	Lara	71.62	67.52	75.90	8.38	−1.60	70.02	0.55	70.57	66.37	75.00	8.63	−1.05
Venezuela	Yaracuy	71.39	67.31	75.62	8.31	−1.59	69.80	0.54	70.34	66.16	74.72	8.56	−1.05
Venezuela	Cojedes	71.25	67.18	75.46	8.28	−1.58	69.67	0.54	70.21	66.04	74.56	8.52	−1.04
Venezuela	Zulia	71.24	67.16	75.44	8.28	−1.59	69.65	0.55	70.20	66.02	74.54	8.52	−1.04
Venezuela	Portuguesa	70.65	66.61	74.72	8.11	−1.57	69.08	0.54	69.62	65.48	73.83	8.35	−1.03
Venezuela	Amazonas Federal Territory	68.09	64.16	71.55	7.39	−1.52	66.57	0.52	67.09	63.06	70.70	7.64	−1.00
Suriname	Brokopondo and Sipaliwini	73.97	70.54	77.76	7.22	−2.01	71.96	0.01	71.97	68.75	75.60	6.85	−2.00
Suriname	Nickerie, Coronie and Saramacca	73.71	70.30	77.45	7.15	−2.01	71.70	0.02	71.72	68.51	75.29	6.78	−1.99
Suriname	Commewijne and Marowijne	73.19	69.83	76.83	7.00	−1.99	71.20	0.01	71.21	68.05	74.69	6.64	−1.98
Suriname	Wanica and Para	72.23	68.93	75.66	6.73	−1.97	70.26	0.02	70.28	67.18	73.56	6.38	−1.95
Suriname	Paramaribo	70.79	67.59	73.93	6.34	−1.92	68.87	0.01	68.88	65.87	71.87	6.00	−1.91
Paraguay	Central (Asuncion, Central)	74.72	72.03	77.77	5.74	−3.41	71.31	0.21	71.52	68.66	74.85	6.19	−3.20
Paraguay	South-East (Guaira, Misiones, Paraguari, Neembucu)	74.09	71.42	77.01	5.59	−3.38	70.71	0.21	70.92	68.08	74.12	6.04	−3.17
Paraguay	South-West (Caazapa, Itapua)	73.75	71.09	76.60	5.51	−3.37	70.38	0.22	70.60	67.76	73.72	5.96	−3.15
Paraguay	North-East (Caaguazu, Alto Parana, Canideyu)	72.76	70.12	75.39	5.27	−3.32	69.44	0.21	69.65	66.84	72.56	5.72	−3.11
Paraguay	North-West (Boqueron, Alto Paraguay, Presidente Hayes, Conception, Amambay, San pedro, Cordillera)	72.62	69.98	75.22	5.24	−3.31	69.31	0.21	69.52	66.71	72.40	5.69	−3.10
Bolivia	Santa Cruz	72.27	69.76	76.00	6.24	−4.49	67.78	1.39	69.17	66.45	73.23	6.78	−3.10
Bolivia	Tarija	71.93	69.43	75.58	6.15	−4.46	67.47	1.37	68.84	66.13	72.83	6.70	−3.09
Bolivia	Chuquisaca	70.79	68.31	74.17	5.86	−4.40	66.39	1.36	67.75	65.07	71.46	6.39	−3.04
Bolivia	Beni	70.68	68.21	74.03	5.82	−4.39	66.29	1.35	67.64	64.97	71.33	6.36	−3.04
Bolivia	Pando	69.87	67.40	73.02	5.62	−4.34	65.53	1.34	66.87	64.20	70.36	6.16	−3.00
Bolivia	Oruro	68.84	66.37	71.73	5.36	−4.28	64.56	1.32	65.88	63.22	69.11	5.89	−2.96
Bolivia	La Paz	67.15	64.67	69.60	4.93	−4.17	62.98	1.29	64.27	61.60	67.07	5.47	−2.88
Bolivia	Cochabamba	66.64	64.14	68.95	4.81	−4.14	62.50	1.28	63.78	61.10	66.44	5.34	−2.86
Bolivia	Potosi	61.77	58.95	62.61	3.66	−3.83	57.94	1.18	59.12	56.15	60.33	4.18	−2.65
Guyana	East Berbice-Corentyne	71.33	67.84	75.32	7.48	−3.56	67.77	0.33	68.10	64.72	71.95	7.23	−3.23
Guyana	Upper Takutu-Upper Essequibo	71.05	67.58	74.98	7.40	−3.55	67.50	0.33	67.83	64.47	71.62	7.15	−3.22
Guyana	Demerara-Mahaica	69.53	66.19	73.16	6.97	−3.47	66.06	0.32	66.38	63.14	69.87	6.73	−3.15
Guyana	Mahaica-Berbice	69.37	65.86	73.26	7.40	−3.46	65.91	0.32	66.23	62.83	69.98	7.15	−3.14
Guyana	Pomeroon-Supenaam	67.79	64.56	71.03	6.47	−3.39	64.40	0.31	64.71	61.59	67.84	6.25	−3.08
Guyana	Barima-Waini	67.51	64.30	70.69	6.39	−3.37	64.14	0.30	64.44	61.34	67.52	6.18	−3.07
Guyana	Essequibo Islands-West Demerara	67.17	63.98	70.28	6.30	−3.35	63.82	0.31	64.13	61.04	67.13	6.09	−3.04
Guyana	Upper Demerara-Berbice	67.09	63.91	70.18	6.27	−3.35	63.74	0.31	64.05	60.96	67.03	6.07	−3.04
Guyana	Cuyuni-Mazaruni	66.66	63.50	69.65	6.15	−3.33	63.33	0.30	63.63	60.58	66.53	5.95	−3.03
Guyana	Potaro-Siparuni	66.46	63.14	69.72	6.58	−3.32	63.14	0.31	63.45	60.23	66.59	6.36	−3.01

== See also ==
- List of South American countries by life expectancy
- List of Argentine provinces and territories by life expectancy
- List of Brazilian states by life expectancy
- List of oldest people
- Longevity
- Life extension
