= List of South American countries by life expectancy =

South American countries by life expectancy

This is a list of South American countries by life expectancy.

== United Nations (2023) ==
Estimation of the analytical agency of the UN.

=== UN: Estimate of life expectancy for various ages in 2023 ===
Countries and territories	Life expectancy for population in general							Life expectancy for male				Life expectancy for female				Sex gap				Population (thous.)	
Countries and territories	at birth	bonus 0→15	at 15	bonus 15→65	at 65	bonus 65→80	at 80	at birth	at 15	at 65	at 80	at birth	at 15	at 65	at 80	at birth	at 15	at 65	at 80	Population (thous.)	
Chile	81.17	0.52	66.68	3.91	20.59	4.52	10.11	79.24	64.79	19.59	9.66	83.08	68.56	21.49	10.46	3.84	3.77	1.89	0.81	19659	(Chile)
Falkland Islands	79.21	0.96	65.17	2.98	18.16	4.84	8.00	77.15	63.09	16.45	7.07	81.24	67.22	19.68	8.84	4.09	4.12	3.23	1.77	3	
Uruguay	78.14	0.61	63.75	5.19	18.94	5.90	9.84	74.19	59.82	16.02	7.72	81.92	67.51	21.31	11.06	7.73	7.69	5.29	3.34	3388	(Uruguay)
Peru	77.74	1.38	64.11	5.42	19.54	5.19	9.73	75.41	61.88	18.12	8.60	80.12	66.40	20.90	10.72	4.71	4.52	2.78	2.12	33846	(Peru)
Colombia	77.72	1.13	63.85	4.53	18.38	4.43	7.80	74.95	61.15	16.86	6.79	80.45	66.49	19.70	8.53	5.50	5.34	2.84	1.75	52321	(Colombia)
Argentina	77.69	0.93	63.32	4.79	18.11	5.65	8.76	74.81	60.76	16.20	7.66	79.88	65.77	19.72	9.44	5.07	5.01	3.51	1.78	45538	(Argentina)
Ecuador	77.39	1.12	63.51	5.24	18.75	4.58	8.34	74.66	60.86	17.25	7.32	80.14	66.17	20.10	9.09	5.47	5.32	2.86	1.77	17980	(Ecuador)
French Guiana	76.98	0.90	62.88	3.83	16.70	5.30	7.01	74.13	60.22	15.11	6.18	79.99	65.67	18.40	7.73	5.86	5.45	3.29	1.55	303	(French Guiana)
South America	76.21	1.30	62.51	5.58	18.09	5.10	8.19	73.26	59.64	16.59	7.38	79.18	65.39	19.40	8.76	5.92	5.75	2.81	1.37	433024	
Brazil	75.85	1.17	62.02	5.77	17.79	4.97	7.77	72.76	59.01	16.39	7.13	78.98	65.06	19.03	8.23	6.22	6.05	2.64	1.10	211141	(Brazil)
Paraguay	73.84	1.44	60.29	5.96	16.25	6.21	7.46	70.89	57.42	14.73	6.62	76.95	63.29	17.65	8.07	6.07	5.87	2.92	1.46	6844	(Paraguay)
Suriname	73.63	1.41	60.04	6.85	16.89	6.40	8.28	70.46	56.93	14.72	6.85	76.83	63.16	18.67	9.20	6.38	6.23	3.94	2.35	629	(Suriname)
World	73.17	3.29	61.46	6.11	17.57	5.75	8.31	70.55	58.91	16.01	7.43	75.89	64.09	18.98	8.96	5.34	5.18	2.97	1.53	8091735	
Venezuela	72.51	1.62	59.14	7.39	16.53	5.36	6.89	68.72	55.42	14.92	6.21	76.50	63.02	17.92	7.34	7.78	7.60	3.00	1.14	28301	(Venezuela)
Guyana	70.18	2.00	57.18	8.15	15.33	7.60	7.93	66.51	53.64	13.44	6.86	73.94	60.78	17.01	8.68	7.44	7.14	3.57	1.81	826	(Guyana)
Bolivia	68.58	3.64	57.22	7.73	14.94	7.08	7.02	66.13	54.96	13.99	6.55	71.14	59.55	15.78	7.35	5.02	4.59	1.79	0.79	12244	(Bolivia)

=== UN: Change of life expectancy from 2019 to 2023 ===
Countries and territories	2023				Historical data									Recovery from COVID-19: 2019→2023	Population (thous.)	
Countries and territories	All	Male	Female	Sex gap	2019	2019 →2020	2020	2020 →2021	2021	2021 →2022	2022	2022 →2023	2023	Recovery from COVID-19: 2019→2023	Population (thous.)	
Chile	81.17	79.24	83.08	3.84	80.32	−0.97	79.35	−0.47	78.88	0.30	79.18	1.99	81.17	0.84	19659	(Chile)
Falkland Islands	79.21	77.15	81.24	4.09	78.61	0.16	78.78	0.21	78.99	0.06	79.05	0.17	79.21	0.60	3	
Uruguay	78.14	74.19	81.92	7.73	77.50	0.88	78.38	−2.95	75.43	1.03	76.47	1.67	78.14	0.64	3388	(Uruguay)
Peru	77.74	75.41	80.12	4.71	76.28	−2.44	73.83	−2.24	71.60	5.24	76.83	0.91	77.74	1.47	33846	(Peru)
Colombia	77.72	74.95	80.45	5.50	76.79	−2.04	74.76	−2.06	72.70	3.81	76.51	1.22	77.72	0.93	52321	(Colombia)
Argentina	77.39	74.81	79.88	5.07	76.85	−0.97	75.88	−1.93	73.95	1.86	75.81	1.59	77.39	0.55	45538	(Argentina)
Ecuador	77.39	74.66	80.14	5.47	77.29	−5.28	72.00	0.74	72.75	3.83	76.58	0.81	77.39	0.11	17980	(Ecuador)
French Guiana	76.98	74.13	79.99	5.86	76.57	0.94	77.51	−3.31	74.19	2.60	76.79	0.18	76.98	0.41	303	(French Guiana)
Brazil	75.85	72.76	78.98	6.22	75.81	−1.30	74.51	−1.47	73.04	1.83	74.87	0.98	75.85	0.04	211141	(Brazil)
Paraguay	73.84	70.89	76.95	6.07	73.67	−0.95	72.72	−4.61	68.11	4.21	72.32	1.52	73.84	0.18	6844	(Paraguay)
Suriname	73.63	70.46	76.83	6.38	71.77	0.55	72.32	−3.38	68.94	4.31	73.25	0.38	73.63	1.86	629	(Suriname)
Venezuela	72.51	68.72	76.50	7.78	72.77	−0.40	72.37	−0.83	71.54	1.03	72.57	−0.05	72.51	−0.25	28301	(Venezuela)
Guyana	70.18	66.51	73.94	7.44	69.07	−1.32	67.75	−3.43	64.32	5.57	69.89	0.29	70.18	1.11	826	(Guyana)
Bolivia	68.58	66.13	71.14	5.02	67.82	−4.91	62.91	−1.48	61.43	6.01	67.43	1.15	68.58	0.76	12244	(Bolivia)

== World Bank Group (2024) ==
Estimation of the World Bank Group for 2024. The data is filtered according to the list of countries in South America. The values in the World Bank Group tables are rounded. All calculations are based on raw data, so due to the nuances of rounding, in some places illusory inconsistencies of indicators arose, with a size of 0.01 year.

World Bank Group (2024)
Countries and territories	2024				Historical data													recovery from COVID-19: 2019→2024	
Countries and territories	All	Male	Female	Sex gap	2014	2014 →2019	2019	2019 →2020	2020	2020 →2021	2021	2021 →2022	2022	2022 →2023	2023	2023 →2024	2024	recovery from COVID-19: 2019→2024	
Chile	81.36	79.45	83.23	3.77	79.71	0.61	80.32	−0.97	79.35	−0.47	78.88	0.30	79.18	1.99	81.17	0.19	81.36	1.03	(Chile)
Uruguay	78.29	74.38	82.04	7.66	77.19	0.31	77.50	0.88	78.38	−2.95	75.43	1.03	76.47	1.67	78.14	0.15	78.29	0.78	(Uruguay)
Peru	77.94	75.63	80.30	4.67	75.26	1.02	76.28	−2.44	73.83	−2.24	71.60	5.24	76.83	0.91	77.74	0.20	77.94	1.67	(Peru)
Colombia	77.91	75.16	80.61	5.45	75.95	0.84	76.79	−2.04	74.76	−2.06	72.70	3.81	76.51	1.22	77.72	0.19	77.91	1.12	(Colombia)
Ecuador	77.58	74.88	80.31	5.43	76.14	1.14	77.29	−5.28	72.00	0.74	72.75	3.83	76.58	0.81	77.39	0.19	77.58	0.29	(Ecuador)
Argentina	77.54	74.98	80.02	5.04	76.27	0.58	76.85	−0.97	75.88	−1.93	73.95	1.86	75.81	1.59	77.39	0.15	77.54	0.70	(Argentina)
Brazil	76.02	72.95	79.14	6.19	74.82	0.99	75.81	−1.30	74.51	−1.47	73.04	1.83	74.87	0.98	75.85	0.17	76.02	0.21	(Brazil)
Paraguay	73.98	71.01	77.09	6.08	73.42	0.25	73.67	−0.95	72.72	−4.61	68.11	4.21	72.32	1.52	73.84	0.14	73.98	0.31	(Paraguay)
Suriname	73.76	70.59	76.98	6.38	70.33	1.44	71.77	0.55	72.32	−3.38	68.94	4.31	73.25	0.38	73.63	0.13	73.76	1.98	(Suriname)
World	73.48	71.11	75.97	4.86	71.78	1.09	72.87	−0.69	72.18	−0.97	71.21	1.75	72.97	0.36	73.33	0.15	73.48	0.61	
Venezuela	72.67	68.89	76.66	7.77	72.84	−0.07	72.77	−0.40	72.37	−0.83	71.54	1.03	72.57	−0.05	72.51	0.16	72.67	−0.09	(Venezuela)
Guyana	70.32	66.62	74.09	7.47	67.33	1.73	69.07	−1.32	67.75	−3.43	64.32	5.57	69.89	0.29	70.18	0.14	70.32	1.25	(Guyana)
Bolivia	68.74	66.27	71.32	5.06	66.97	0.85	67.82	−4.91	62.91	−1.48	61.43	6.01	67.43	1.15	68.58	0.16	68.74	0.92	(Bolivia)

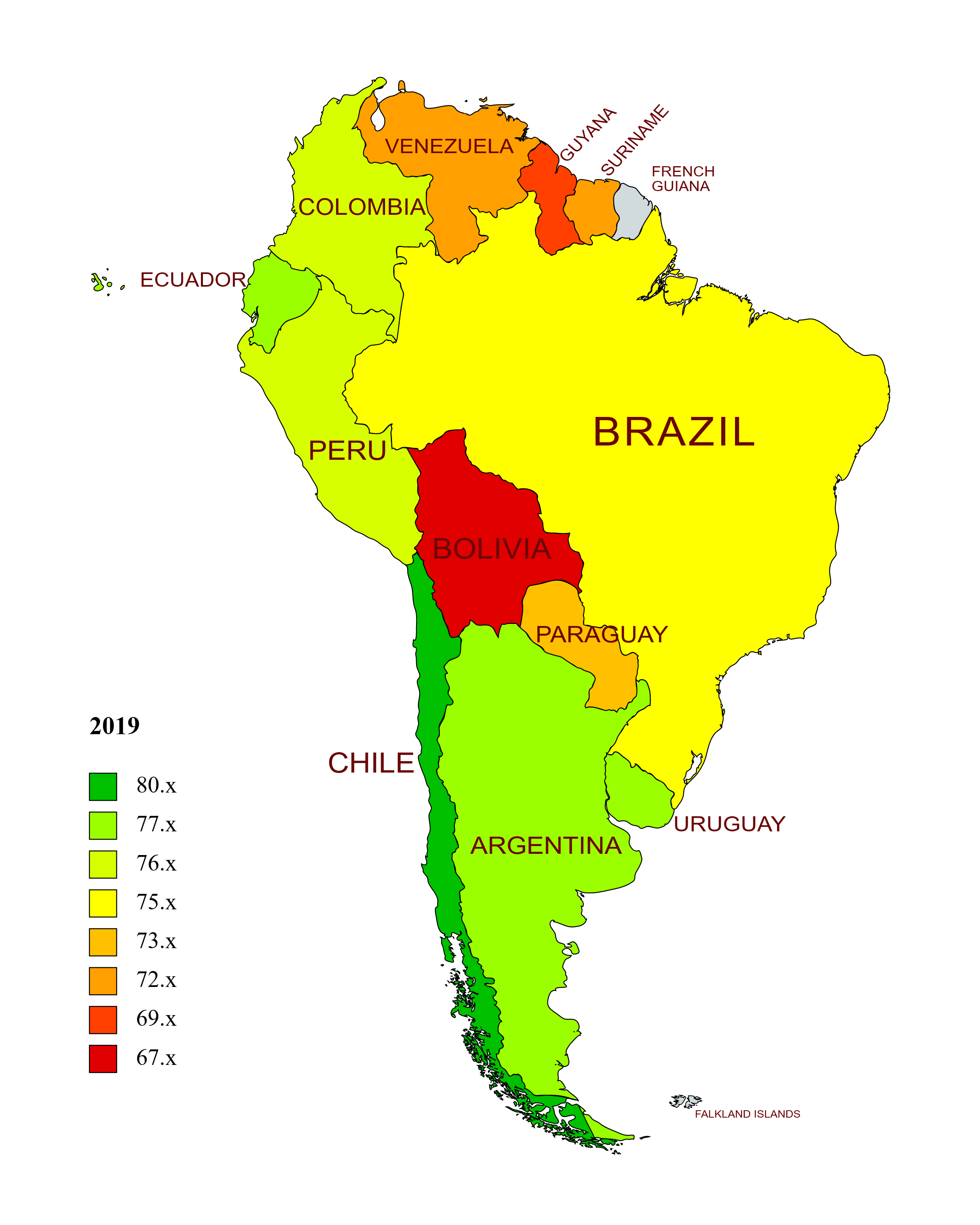
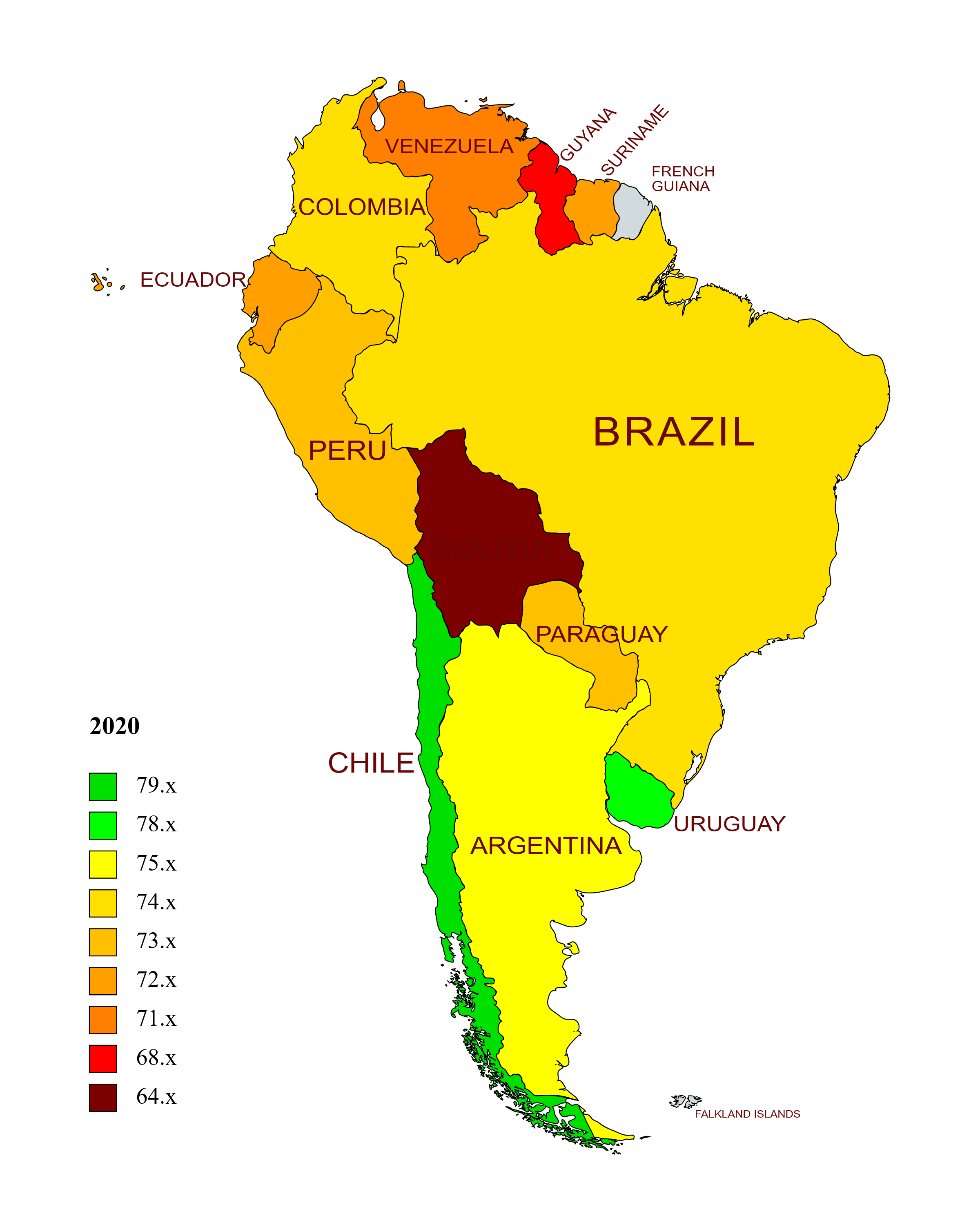
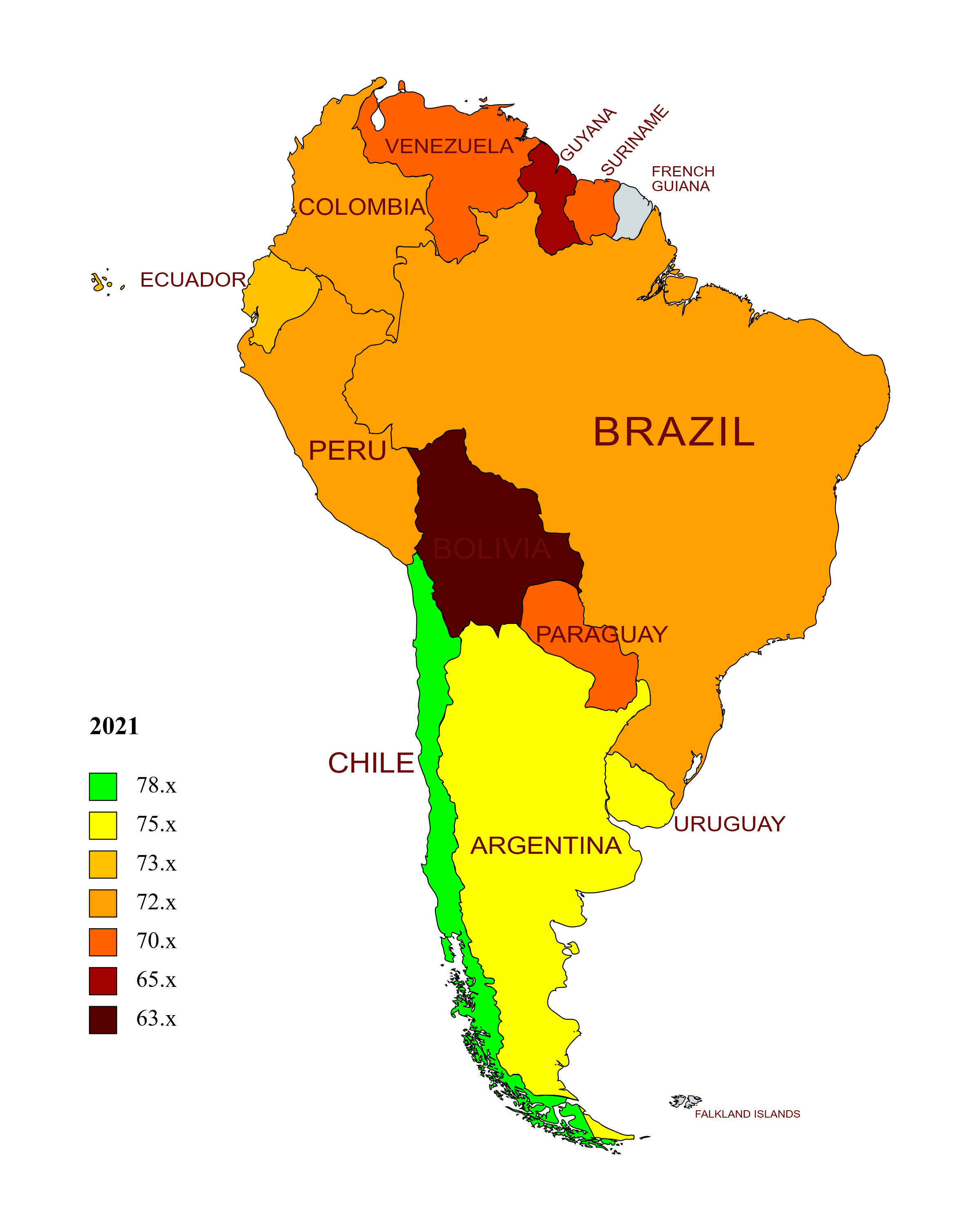
Change in life expectancy in South America from 2019 to 2021

== WHO (2019) ==
Estimation of the World Health Organization for 2019.

World Health Organization (2019)
Countries	Life expectancy at birth					HALE at birth					Life expectancy at age 60					HALE at age 60					
Countries	All	M	F	FΔM	Δ 2000	All	M	F	FΔM	Δ 2000	All	M	F	FΔM	Δ 2000	All	M	F	FΔM	Δ 2000	
Chile	81.03	78.66	83.34	4.68	4.23	69.37	68.65	70.05	1.40	3.11	24.57	23.01	25.97	2.96	3.25	18.34	17.48	19.10	1.62	2.11	(Chile)
Peru	78.29	76.69	79.88	3.19	3.17	68.41	67.97	68.86	0.89	2.99	23.37	22.59	24.10	1.51	0.56	18.02	17.65	18.37	0.72	0.47	(Peru)
Colombia	77.95	75.33	80.55	5.22	5.41	67.90	66.44	69.34	2.90	4.58	22.69	21.20	24.03	2.83	2.40	17.41	16.42	18.31	1.89	1.80	(Colombia)
Ecuador	77.75	75.32	80.23	4.91	5.16	67.62	66.42	68.83	2.41	4.12	22.83	21.46	24.12	2.66	2.27	17.36	16.50	18.17	1.67	1.51	(Ecuador)
Americas	77.07	74.42	79.76	5.34	2.98	65.76	64.51	67.01	2.50	2.19	22.64	21.23	23.92	2.69	1.62	16.61	15.74	17.40	1.66	0.96	
Argentina	77.02	74.00	79.91	5.91	2.73	66.90	65.43	68.27	2.84	2.17	21.59	19.24	23.64	4.40	1.28	16.50	14.99	17.81	2.82	0.86	(Argentina)
Uruguay	77.01	73.36	80.50	7.14	2.13	66.81	64.91	68.60	3.69	1.47	21.71	18.95	24.04	5.09	1.02	16.51	14.71	18.02	3.31	0.59	(Uruguay)
Brazil	75.48	72.22	78.73	6.51	3.98	64.53	62.96	66.07	3.11	3.61	21.32	19.58	22.84	3.26	1.54	15.81	14.74	16.74	2.00	1.13	(Brazil)
Paraguay	75.08	72.18	78.16	5.98	0.40	64.87	63.47	66.38	2.91	0.46	21.01	19.22	22.82	3.60	−1.09	15.88	14.73	17.04	2.31	−0.85	(Paraguay)
World	73.12	70.61	75.70	5.09	6.35	63.45	62.33	64.59	2.26	5.33	21.03	19.41	22.54	3.13	2.16	15.80	14.87	16.67	1.80	1.52	
Suriname	73.02	69.99	76.10	6.11	2.46	63.12	61.48	64.76	3.28	1.74	20.69	18.80	22.31	3.51	1.10	15.62	14.30	16.74	2.44	0.59	(Suriname)
Bolivia	72.92	72.03	73.79	1.76	6.83	63.64	63.72	63.54	−0.18	5.87	19.42	19.07	19.71	0.64	1.62	14.79	14.69	14.88	0.19	1.10	(Bolivia)
Venezuela	72.71	68.38	77.35	8.97	−1.32	63.40	60.57	66.43	5.86	−0.98	20.67	18.52	22.64	4.12	−0.54	15.77	14.31	17.11	2.80	−0.39	(Venezuela)
Guyana	68.73	65.58	71.99	6.41	4.08	59.14	57.25	61.11	3.86	3.19	18.01	16.52	19.40	2.88	1.56	13.43	12.42	14.39	1.97	1.02	(Guyana)

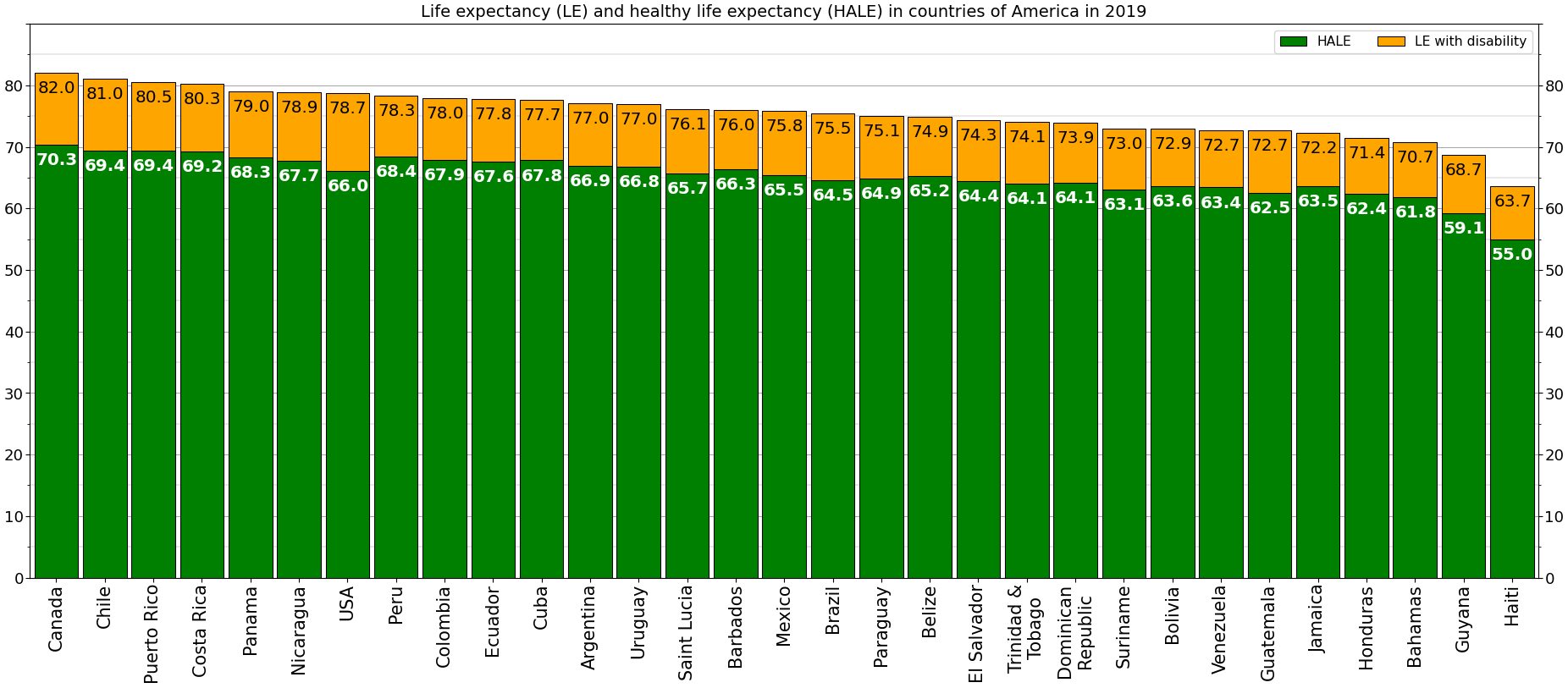
Life expectancy and HALE in countries of America in 2019

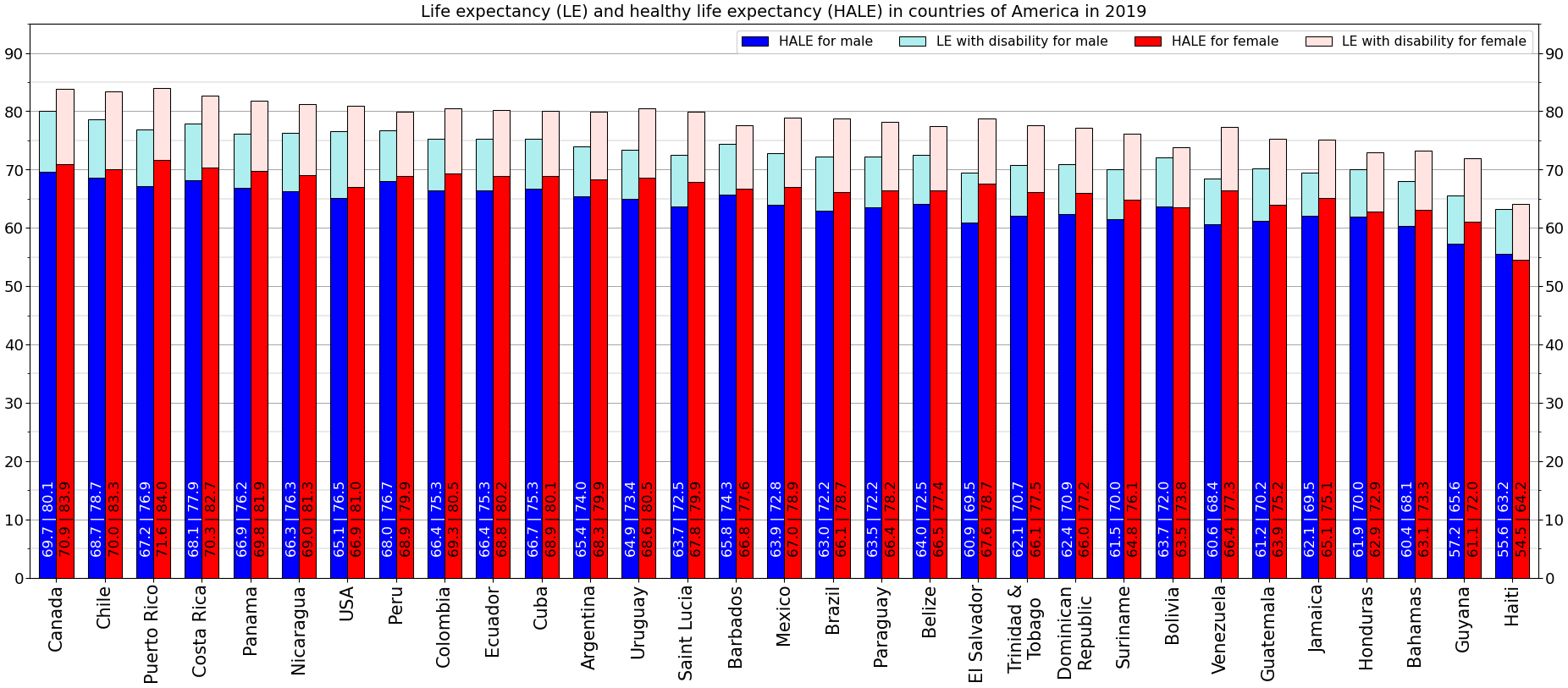
Elaboration by sex

Interactive chart of male and female life expectancy in America as defined by WHO for 2019. Open the original chart and hover over chart elements. The squares of bubbles are proportional to population according to estimation of the UN for 2019.

== Charts ==
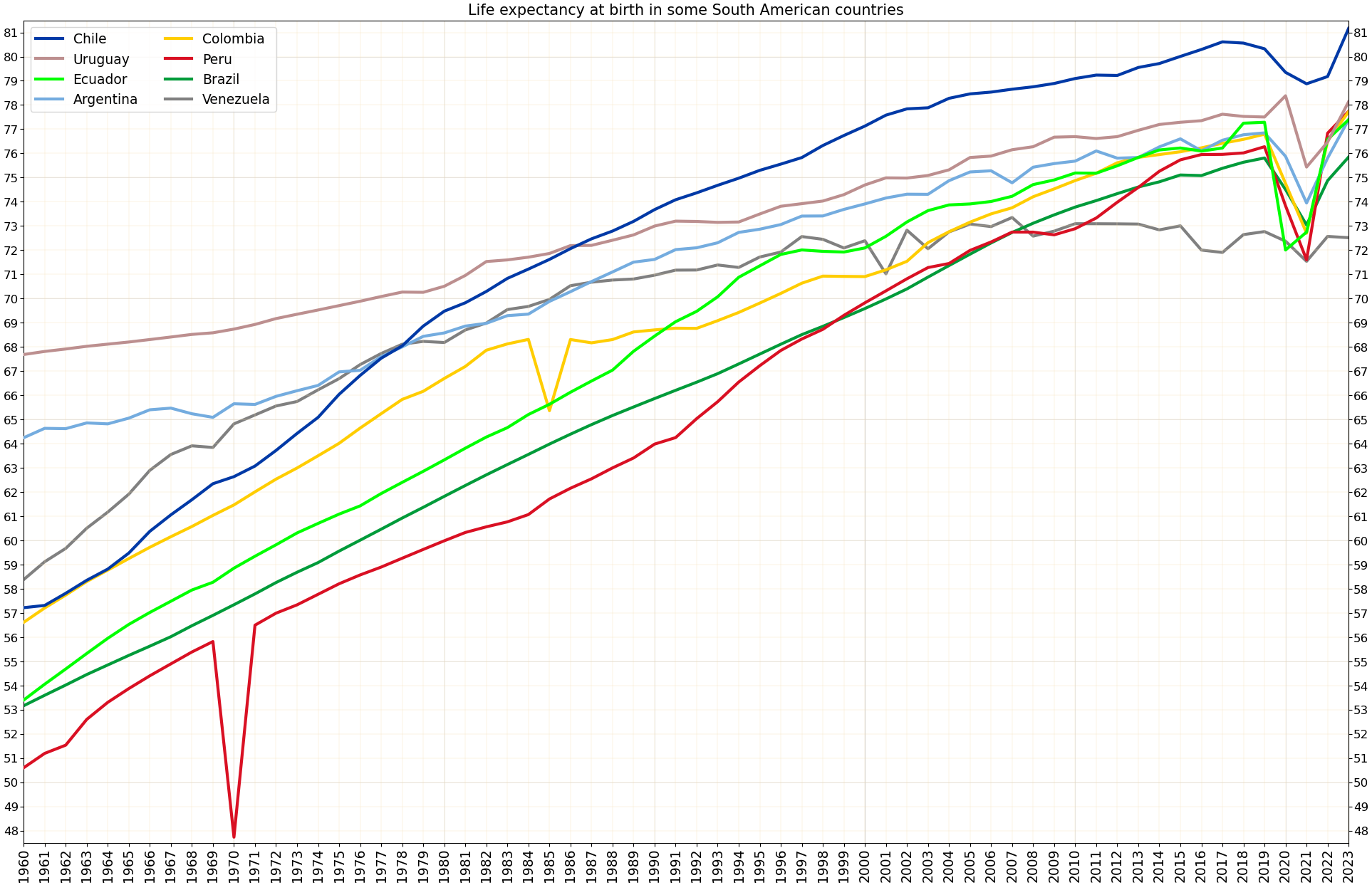
Comparison of life expectancy in some countries of South America

== See also ==
- List of countries by life expectancy
- List of countries in the Americas by life expectancy
- List of South American regions by life expectancy
- List of Argentine provinces and territories by life expectancy
- List of Brazilian states by life expectancy
- List of oldest people
- Longevity
- Life extension
