= List of Brazilian states by life expectancy =

Brazilian states by life expectancy (2022). > 82 81.99 – 81.00 80.99 – 78.80 78.79 – 77.00 76.99 – 74.5 < 74.5

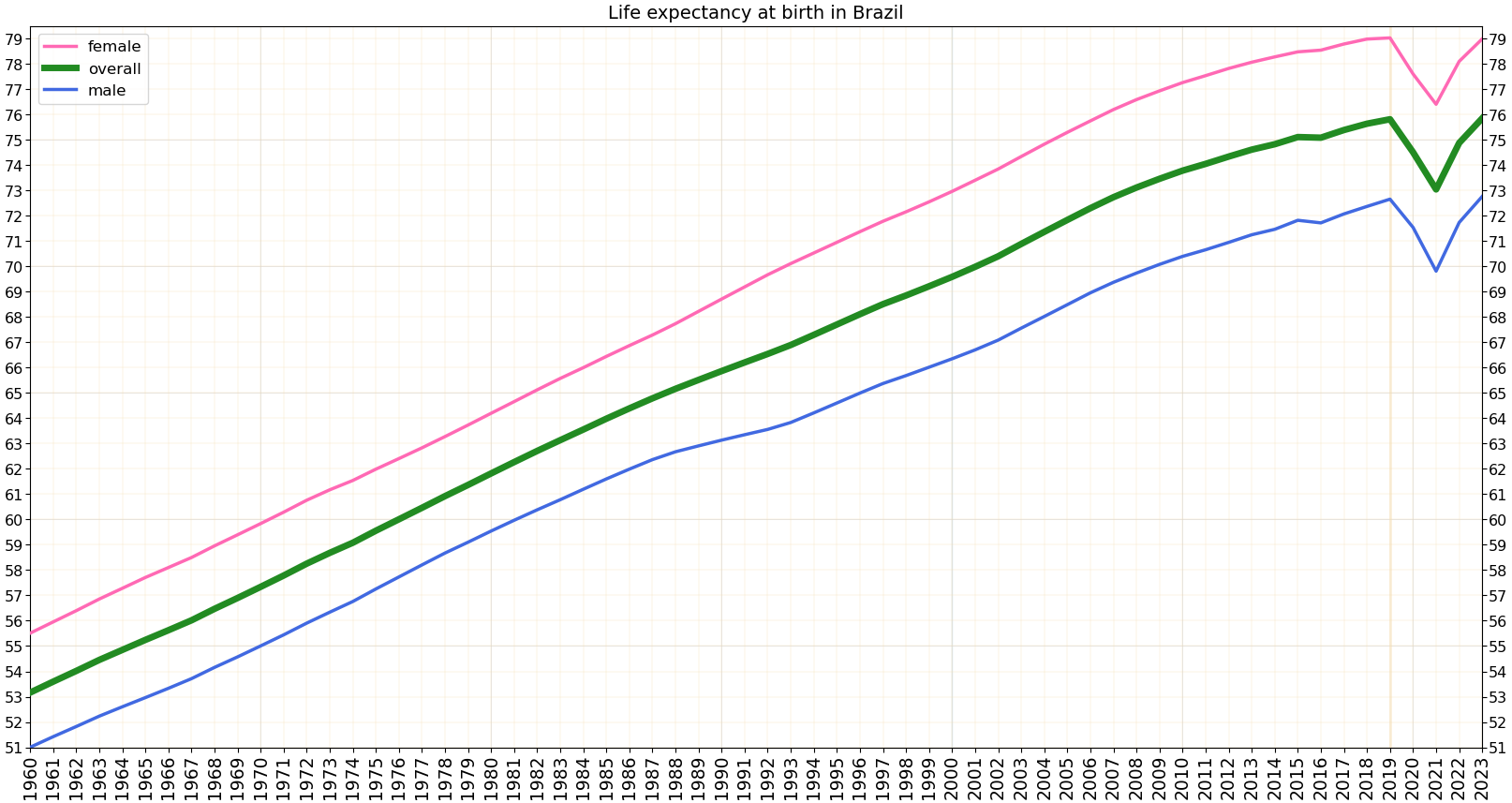
Development of life expectancy in Brazil according to estimation of the World Bank Group

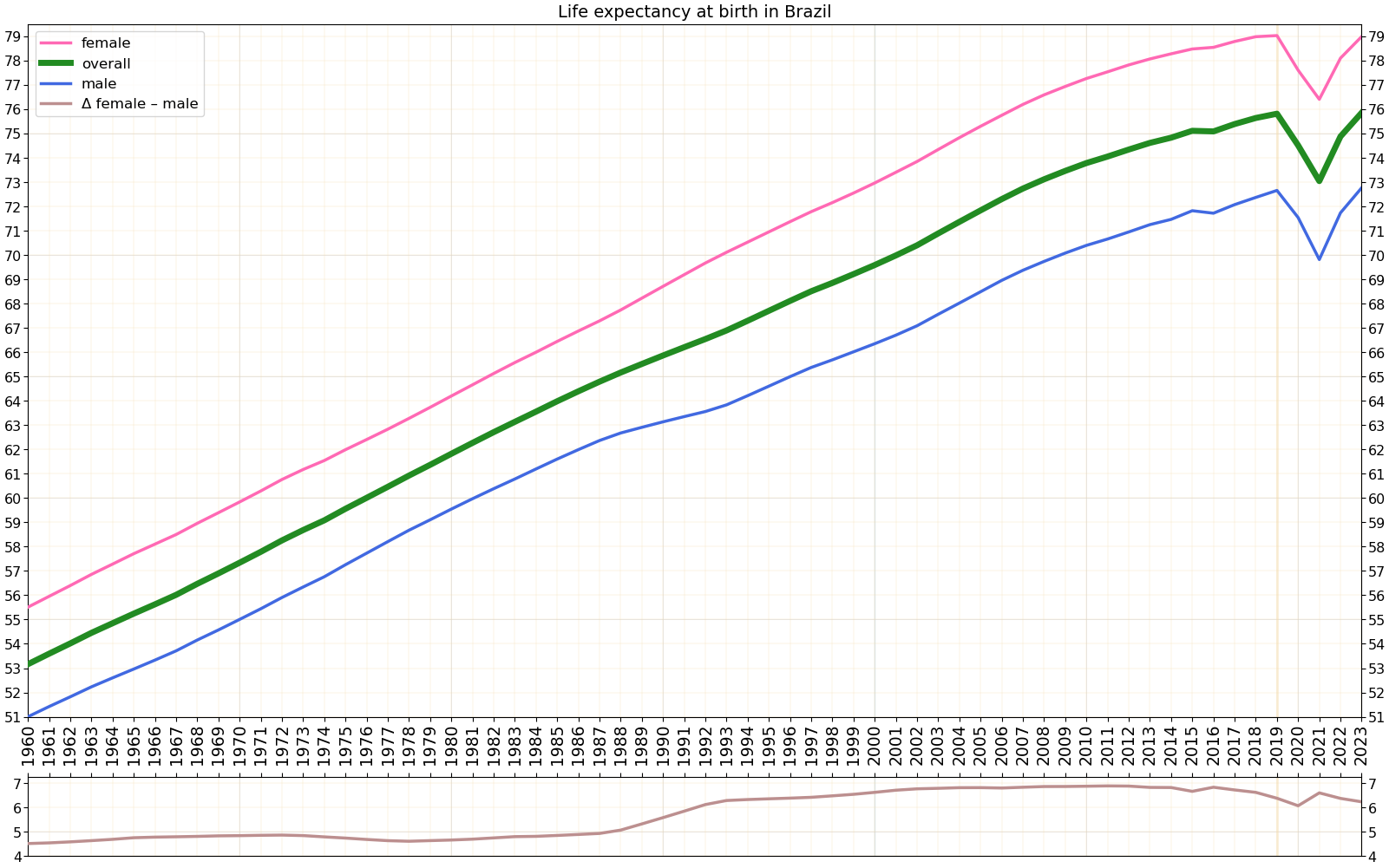
Life expectancy with calculated gender gap

Life expectancy in Brazil according to estimation of the Our World in Data

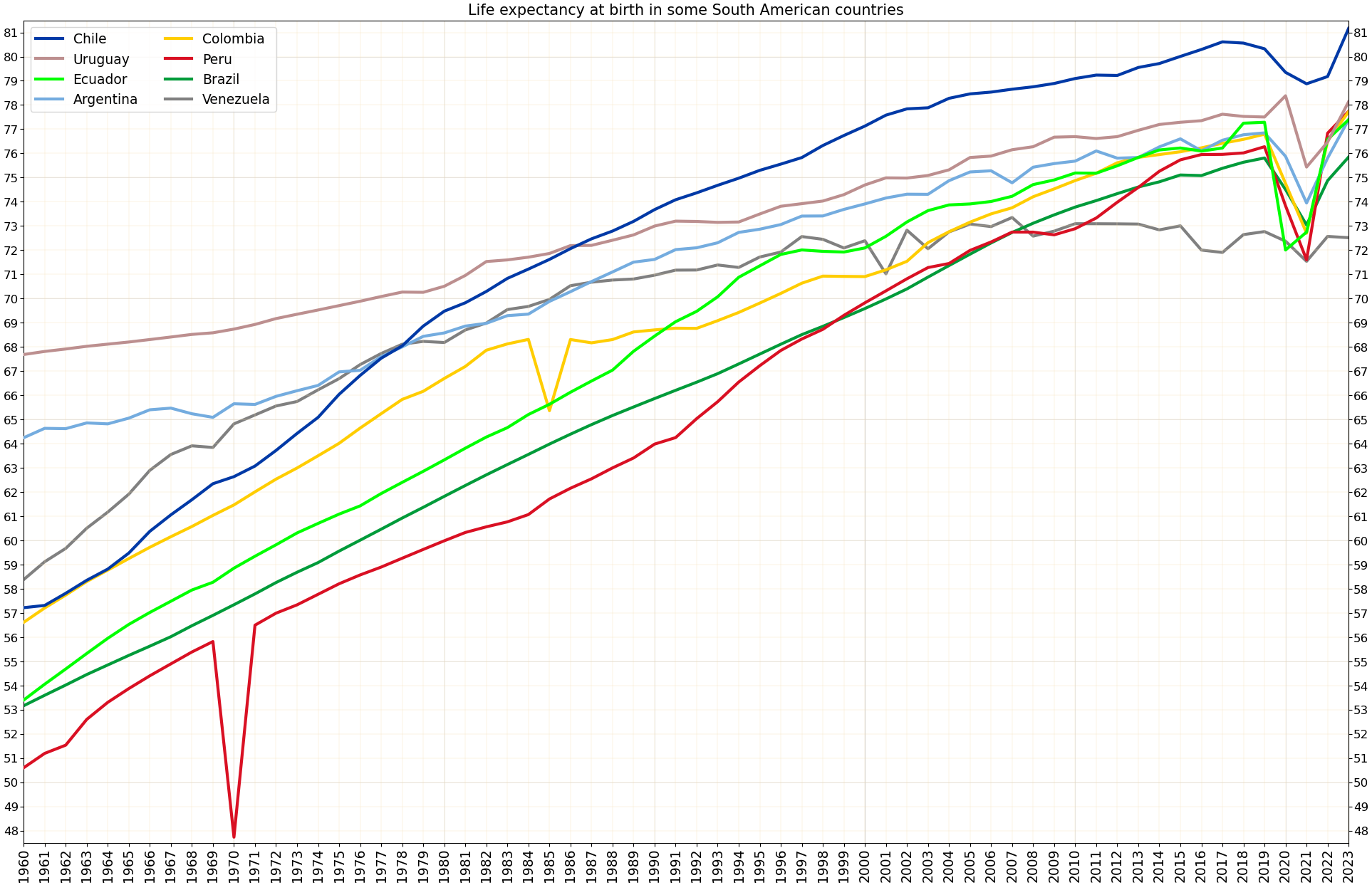
Development of life expectancy in Brazil in comparison to other big countries of South America

Life expectancy and healthy life expectancy in Brazil on the background of other countries of the world in 2019

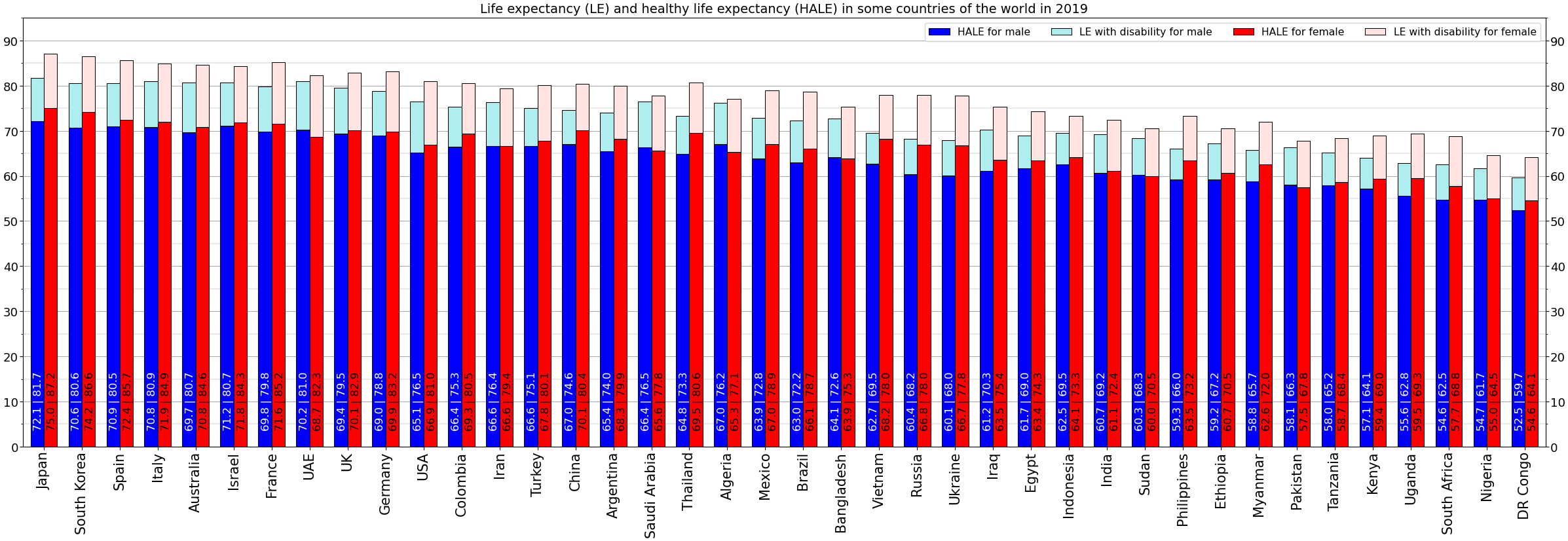
Life expectancy and healthy life expectancy for males and females

There are 26 States of Brazil, or Estados in Portuguese, which are the federal states of Brazil, plus the Federal District which holds the capital city, Brasília. The second number in bold corresponds to the map. This and the figures below are based on 2022 estimate data, the life expectancy at birth for women being 81.23 years and for men 74.30, with an average of 77.76 years expected at birth, both sexes combined.

Life Expectancy in Brazil by subnational entity (2022)
State	Overall	Rank	Men	Rank	Women	Rank
Santa Catarina	82.51	1	79.33	1	85.69	1
Espírito Santo	81.63	2	77.94	3	85.33	2
São Paulo	81.26	3	78.46	2	84.07	5
Distrito Federal	81.11	4	77.73	5	84.48	3
Rio Grande do Sul	81.00	5	77.80	4	84.20	4
Paraná	80.53	6	77.18	7	83.89	6
Minas Gerais	80.42	7	77.67	6	83.17	7
Rio de Janeiro	79.45	8	76.39	8	82.52	9
Rio Grande do Norte	79.17	9	75.50	9	82.84	8
Mato Grosso do Sul	78.80	10	75.30	10	82.31	10
Pernambuco	77.62	11	74.10	14	81.14	12
Mato Grosso	77.62	12	74.36	12	80.88	13
Acre	77.49	13	74.21	13	80.77	14
Amapá	77.16	14	74.72	11	79.60	21
Goiás	76.97	15	73.69	16	80.26	17
Ceará	76.87	16	73.01	18	80.75	15
Tocantins	76.81	17	73.75	15	79.87	20
Paraíba	76.78	18	73.07	17	80.49	16
Bahia	76.75	19	72.24	20	81.26	11
Sergipe	75.90	20	71.72	21	80.07	18
Alagoas	75.40	21	70.75	25	80.06	19
Roraima	75.28	22	73.00	19	77.56	27
Pará	75.21	23	71.14	24	79.29	22
Amazonas	75.18	24	71.72	22	78.65	23
Rondônia	74.50	25	71.25	23	77.75	26
Maranhão	74.11	26	70.38	26	77.84	25
Piauí	74.00	27	69.67	27	78.33	24

== Global Data Lab (2019–2022) ==
region	2019				2019 →2021	2021	2021 →2022	2022				2019 →2022
region	overall	male	female	F Δ M	2019 →2021	overall	2021 →2022	overall	male	female	F Δ M	2019 →2022
**Brazil on average**	75.34	**72.20**	**78.47**	**6.27**	**−2.59**	72.75	**0.68**	73.43	**70.30**	**76.60**	**6.30**	**−1.91**
Federal District (inc. Brasília)	77.89	74.58	81.50	6.92	−2.68	75.21	0.70	75.91	72.61	79.55	6.94	−1.98
Roraima	77.72	74.43	81.31	6.88	−2.67	75.05	0.70	75.75	72.46	79.37	6.91	−1.97
Rio de Janeiro	77.05	73.80	80.51	6.71	−2.65	74.40	0.69	75.09	71.85	78.59	6.74	−1.96
São Paulo	76.65	73.43	80.04	6.61	−2.63	74.02	0.69	74.71	71.49	78.13	6.64	−1.94
Rio Grande do Sul	76.30	73.10	79.61	6.51	−2.63	73.67	0.69	74.36	71.17	77.71	6.54	−1.94
Santa Catarina	76.29	73.09	79.60	6.51	−2.62	73.67	0.68	74.35	71.16	77.70	6.54	−1.94
Mato Grosso	75.93	72.76	79.17	6.41	−2.61	73.32	0.68	74.00	70.83	77.28	6.45	−1.93
Goiás	75.91	72.74	79.15	6.41	−2.61	73.30	0.68	73.98	70.82	77.26	6.44	−1.93
Tocantins	75.87	72.70	79.11	6.41	−2.60	73.27	0.68	73.95	70.78	77.22	6.44	−1.92
Minas Gerais	75.83	72.66	79.05	6.39	−2.61	73.22	0.68	73.90	70.74	77.17	6.43	−1.93
Rondônia	75.74	72.58	78.95	6.37	−2.60	73.14	0.68	73.82	70.66	77.07	6.41	−1.92
Paraná	75.63	72.48	78.82	6.34	−2.59	73.04	0.67	73.71	70.57	76.94	6.37	−1.92
Amapá	75.48	72.34	78.64	6.30	−2.59	72.89	0.68	73.57	70.43	76.76	6.33	−1.91
Mato Grosso do Sul	75.44	72.30	78.59	6.29	−2.59	72.85	0.68	73.53	70.39	76.72	6.33	−1.91
Amazonas	75.34	72.21	78.48	6.27	−2.58	72.76	0.67	73.43	70.30	76.60	6.30	−1.91
Espírito Santo	75.16	72.04	78.26	6.22	−2.58	72.58	0.67	73.25	70.13	76.39	6.26	−1.91
Ceará	75.14	72.02	78.23	6.21	−2.58	72.56	0.67	73.23	70.12	76.37	6.25	−1.91
Sergipe	74.61	71.51	77.59	6.08	−2.57	72.04	0.67	72.71	69.63	75.74	6.11	−1.90
Rio Grande do Norte	74.45	71.37	77.41	6.04	−2.55	71.90	0.66	72.56	69.49	75.56	6.07	−1.89
Pará	74.41	71.33	77.36	6.03	−2.55	71.86	0.66	72.52	69.45	75.52	6.07	−1.89
Paraíba	74.40	71.32	77.34	6.02	−2.56	71.84	0.67	72.51	69.43	75.50	6.07	−1.89
Acre	74.30	71.22	77.22	6.00	−2.56	71.74	0.67	72.41	69.34	75.38	6.04	−1.89
Bahia	74.26	71.19	77.18	5.99	−2.55	71.71	0.66	72.37	69.31	75.34	6.03	−1.89
Pernambuco	74.21	71.14	77.12	5.98	−2.55	71.66	0.67	72.33	69.26	75.28	6.02	−1.88
Maranhão	73.37	70.35	76.12	5.77	−2.52	70.85	0.66	71.51	68.49	74.30	5.81	−1.86
Alagoas	73.33	70.31	76.06	5.75	−2.52	70.81	0.66	71.47	68.45	74.25	5.80	−1.86
Piauí	72.04	69.08	74.51	5.43	−2.48	69.56	0.65	70.21	67.25	72.73	5.48	−1.83

Data source: Global Data Lab

== See also ==
- List of South American countries by life expectancy
- Brazil
- States of Brazil
- List of subnational entities
- List of Latin American subnational entities by HDI
