= List of Argentine provinces and territories by life expectancy =

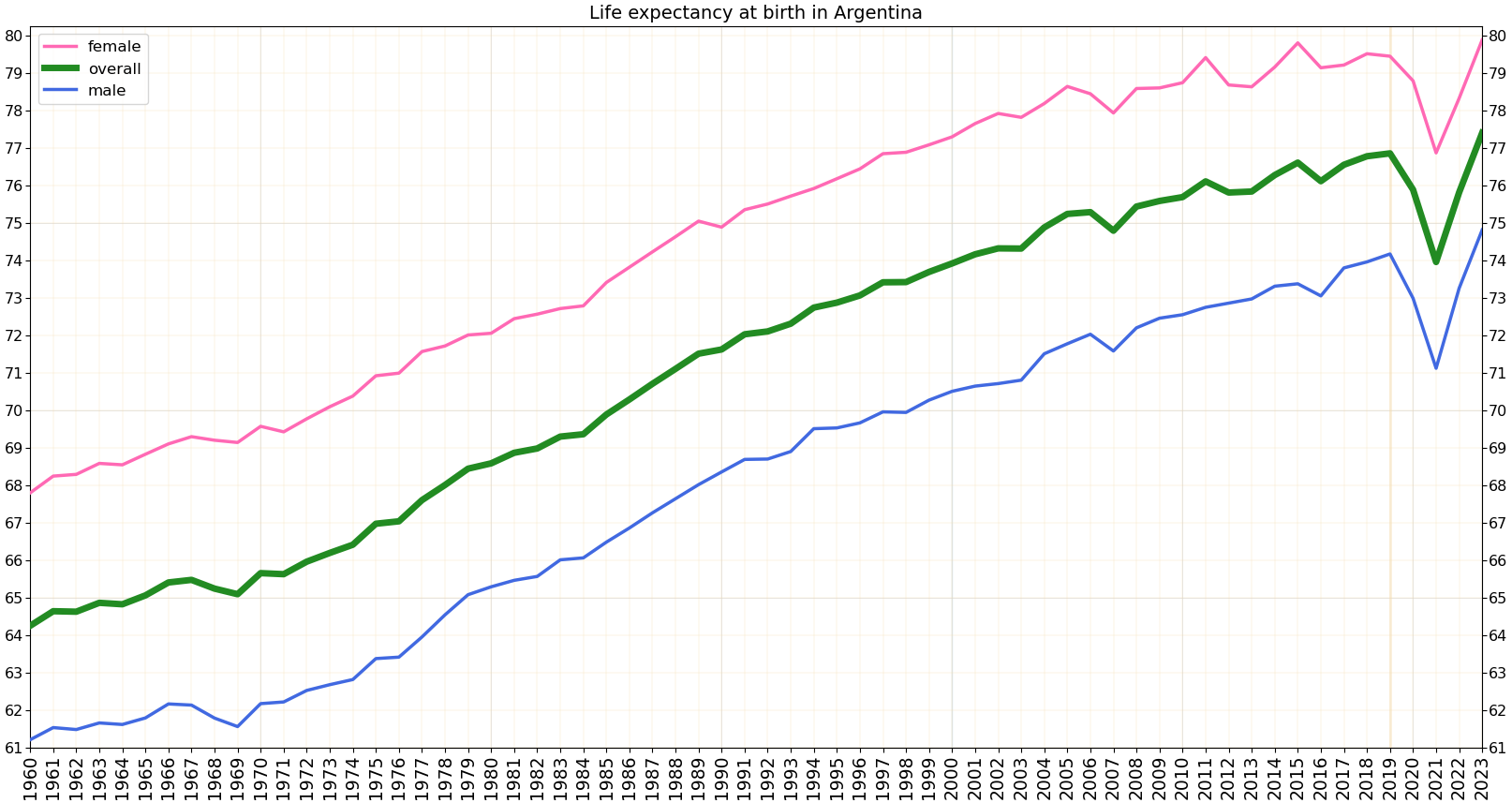
Development of life expectancy in Argentina according to estimation of the World Bank Group

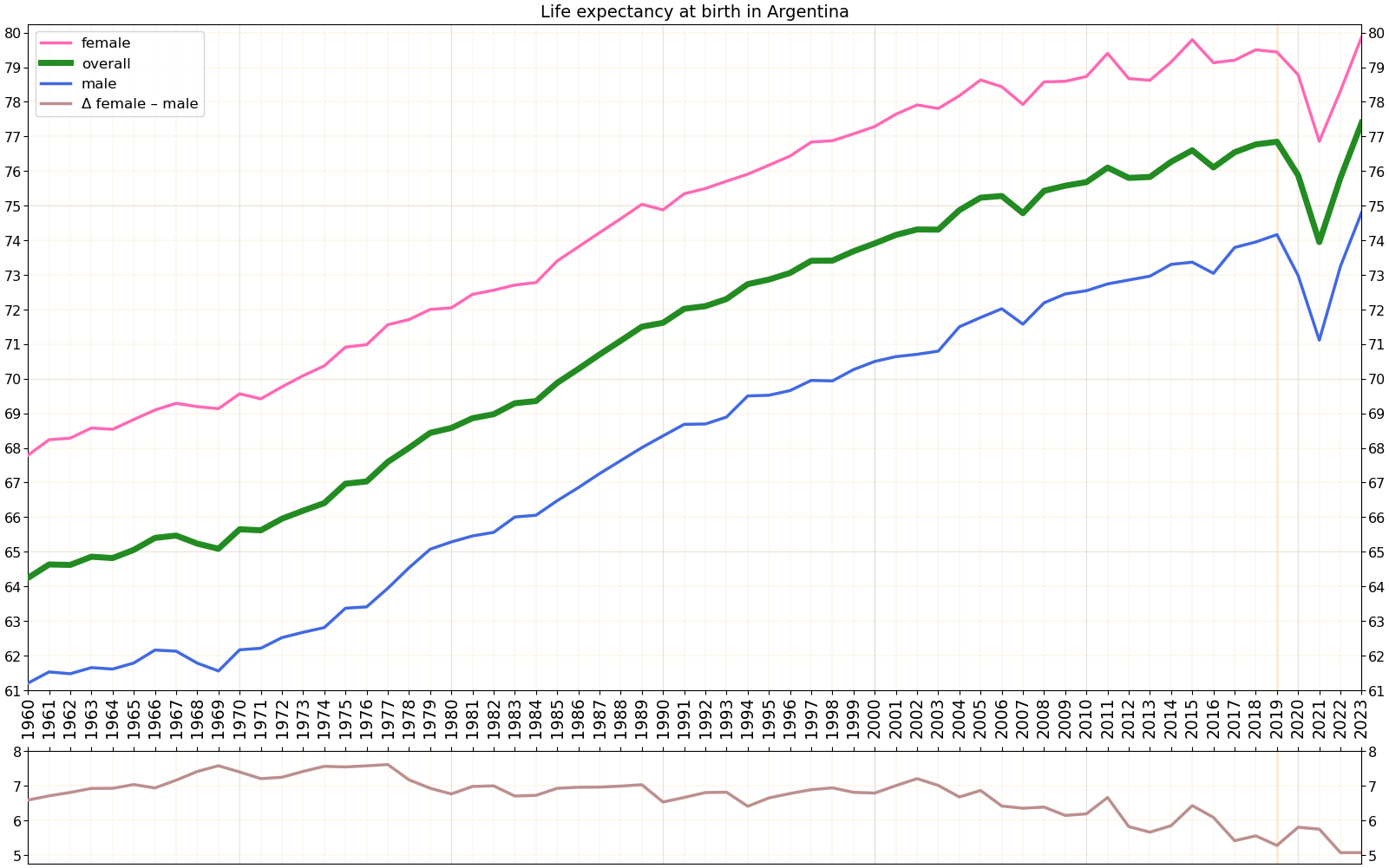
Life expectancy with calculated gender gap

Life expectancy in Argentina according to estimation of the Our World in Data

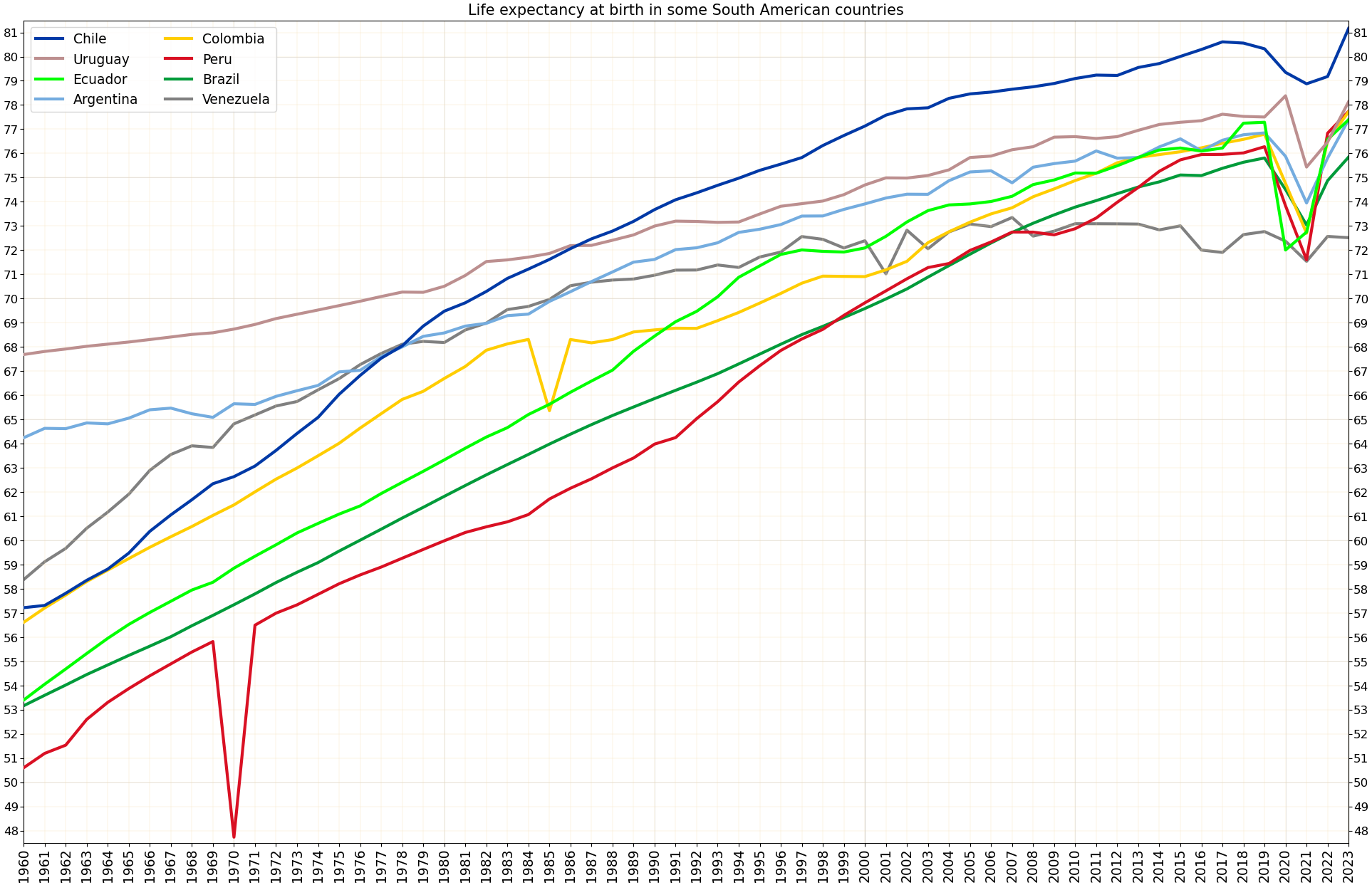
Development of life expectancy in Argentina in comparison to other big countries of South America

Life expectancy and healthy life expectancy in Argentina on the background of other countries of the world in 2019

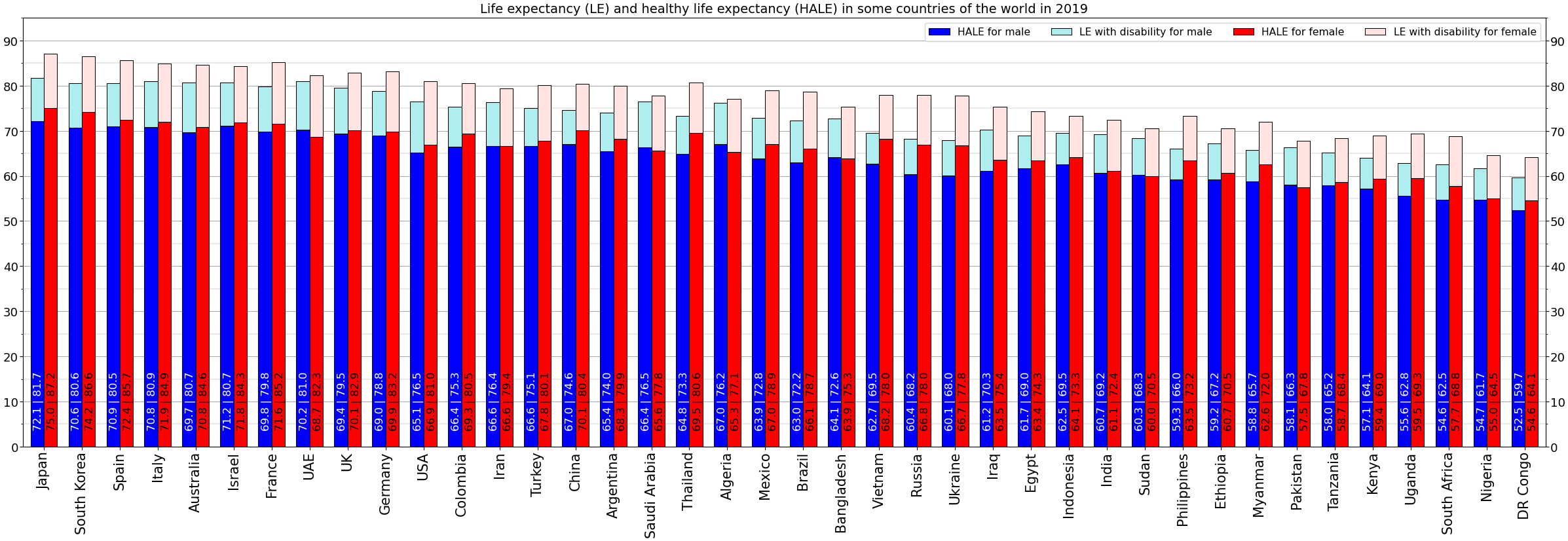
Life expectancy and healthy life expectancy for males and females

This is a list of provinces of Argentina by life expectancy. Life expectancy is the average number of years of age that a group of infants born in the same year can expect to live, if maintained, from birth. The data is from a 2020 report by the Pacific Disaster Center.

== Life expectancy in 2018 ==
Rank	Province/Territory	Life Expectancy
13.	Buenos Aires	75.2
2.	Autonomous City of Buenos Aires	77.2
8.	Catamarca	76
24.	Chaco	72.9
8.	Chubut	76
10.	Córdoba	75.8
20.	Corrientes	74.4
17.	Entre Ríos	75
23.	Formosa	73.9
19.	Jujuy	74.8
6.	La Pampa	76.2
11.	La Rioja	75.3
5.	Mendoza	76.3
22.	Misiones	74.2
1.	Neuquén	77.3
4.	Río Negro	76.4
18.	Salta	74.9
13.	San Juan	75.2
7.	San Luis	76.1
11.	Santa Cruz	75.3
15.	Santa Fe	75.1
21.	Santiago del Estero	74.3
3.	Tierra del Fuego, Antártida e Islas del Atlántico Sur	77
15.	Tucumán	75.1

== See also ==
- List of South American countries by life expectancy
