= Bowe v R =

- Court: Judicial Committee of the Privy Council
- Full case name: Forrester Bowe (Junior) and Trono Davis, Appellants v The Queen, Respondent
- Decided: 8 March 2006
- Citations: [2006] UKPC 10, [2002] 2 AC 235, [2006] 1 WLR 1623

Case history
- Prior action: Court of Appeal of the Bahamas

Case opinions
- Lord Bingham of Cornhill

Keywords
- Capital punishment; inhuman or degrading punishment

Bowe v R is a 2006 Judicial Committee of the Privy Council (JCPC) case in which it was held that it was unconstitutional in the Bahamas for capital punishment to be the mandatory sentence for murder. The JCPC held that because the Constitution of the Bahamas contains a qualified right to life and prohibits "inhuman or degrading punishment", following a murder conviction, a trial judge must have discretion to impose a lesser penalty than death by hanging; capital punishment may be applied only in those cases that contain aggravating factors as compared to other murder cases.

The result in the case reflected the findings R v Hughes, Fox v R, and Reyes v R, 2002 JCPC rulings from other Caribbean jurisdictions.

== See also ==
- Boyce v R
- Matthew v S
