= Caribbean Court of Justice =

Judicial institution of the Caribbean Community

- Established: 16 April 2005
- Jurisdiction: Original jurisdiction: Caribbean Community; Appellate jurisdiction: Barbados; Belize; Dominica; Guyana; St. Lucia
- Location: Port of Spain, Trinidad and Tobago
- Composition method: Appointed by the Regional Judicial and Legal Services Commission from among applicants
- Authorised by: Revised Treaty of Chaguaramas and Agreement establishing the Caribbean Court of Justice
- Appeals to: None
- Judge term length: Until age 72, extendable to age 75 until 9 judges (excluding the president) are appointed.; President: 7 years or until age 72, extendable to age 75 until 9 judges (excluding the president) are appointed, whichever is earlier.
- Number of positions: 7 (of 10)
- Website: www.ccj.org

President
- Currently: Winston Anderson
- Since: 6 July 2025

The Caribbean Court of Justice (CCJ or CCtJ; Dutch: Caribisch Hof van Justitie; French: Cour Caribéenne de Justice) is the judicial institution of the Caribbean Community (CARICOM). Established in 2005, it is based in Port of Spain, Trinidad and Tobago.

The Caribbean Court of Justice has two jurisdictions: an original jurisdiction and an appellate jurisdiction:

- In its original jurisdiction, the court interprets and applies the Revised Treaty of Chaguaramas (which established the Caribbean Community), and is an international court with compulsory and exclusive jurisdiction in respect of the interpretation of the treaty.
- In its appellate jurisdiction, the court hears appeals as the court of last resort in both civil and criminal matters from those member states which have ceased to allow appeals to the Judicial Committee of the Privy Council (JCPC). As of April 2023, Barbados, Belize, Dominica, Guyana and St. Lucia have replaced the JCPC's appellate jurisdiction with that of the CCJ.

National referendums undertaken in Antigua & Barbuda (2018), and Grenada (2018) resulted in the majorities of those nations rejecting the switch of final court of appeals from the Judicial Committee of the Privy Council of the United Kingdom to the CCJ. A previous referendum undertaken in Saint Vincent and the Grenadines in 2009 was also rejected by a majority of voters, although that proposed constitution did not substitute the CCJ for the Privy Council, but rather codified the possibility of doing so via constitutional reform among other proposed changes such as making Saint Vincent and the Grenadines into a republic.

== Overview ==
The CCJ is intended to be a hybrid institution: a municipal court of last resort and an international court vested with original, compulsory and exclusive jurisdiction in respect of the interpretation and application of the Revised Treaty of Chaguaramas. In the exercise of this original jurisdiction, the CCJ discharges the functions of an international tribunal, applying rules of international law in respect of the interpretation and application of the treaty. The CCJ thus performs similarly to the European Court of Justice, EFTA Court, East African Court of Justice, the ECOWAS Community Court of Justice, the Andean Court of Justice and the International Court of Justice. In contrast to many general international tribunals or courts, the original jurisdiction of the CCJ is compulsory, requiring no pre-existing agreement.

As a municipal court of last resort, it exercises an appellate jurisdiction, as a final court of appeal for CARICOM member states, replacing the Judicial Committee of the Privy Council (JCPC) for Anglophone member states. In the exercise of its appellate jurisdiction, the CCJ hears appeals from common law courts within the jurisdictions of parties to the Agreement Establishing the CCJ, and is the highest municipal court in the region.

While the CCJ has jurisdiction in all member states of the Agreement Establishing The Caribbean Court of Justice, the Agreement itself provides for the CCJ's jurisdiction to also be available to any other state within the Caribbean that CARICOM should choose invite to become a party to the Agreement. Thus the appellate jurisdiction of the Court, in particular, could be available to a non-CARICOM Caribbean state or to CARICOM's associate member states.

Unlike some international courts (but similar to others such as the ECJ and EFTA Court), cases between member states, between CARICOM nationals, or between nationals and the state are all justiciable under the CCJ.

Appellate decisions of the court are delivered with signed majority opinions, concurrences and dissenting opinions, as well as a record of which judges voted for the ruling and which voted against it. As a result, CCJ appellate opinions do not shield judges behind a singular and collective "voice of the court" as the ECJ and the CCJ's original opinions do, and the practice is in keeping with the normal procedures of municipal courts. This may actually aid in providing transparency to the regional court operating in an environment where many of its citizens are distrustful of their local judiciaries.

By contrast, judgments or advisory opinions under the original jurisdiction of the Court are published in a single judgment of the court once the majority of judges have reached a conclusion after final deliberation. No other judgments or opinions are permitted to be given or delivered. This is in keeping with the practice of the ECJ and EFTA Court as international courts.

Although there is no ratio or quota for judges based on sex or nationality, most CCJ judges previously sat at a national level or previously taught law for 15 years or more. At least one member of the panel is required to be an expert in international law and one judge is also required to be from the civil law tradition, reflecting the presence of civil law jurisdictions such as Suriname and Haiti.

=== Comparison with the Judicial Committee of the Privy Council ===
Initially being created as a replacement for the Privy Council or JCPC, and later being tasked with the original jurisdiction over the interpretation of the Revised Treaty of Chaguaramas, the CCJ replicates certain aspects of the British justice system while being divergent in other ways.

Both the CCJ and JCPC have a president of the Court and have a smaller panel of judges being called up for any one particular case from a larger pool of eligible judges. For the JCPC, five judges normally sit on appeals from Commonwealth countries, while three to five judges normally sit on the CCJ for cases, although at times all the eligible judges have sat for a case.

A major difference though is in the pool of eligible justices from which the deciding panel is called. For the JCPC has no explicit limit on the number of eligible jurists, while for the CCJ the initial limit is nine judges other than the president (though this limit may be increased by the agreement of all the member states). The actual number of judges eligible for JCPC at any given time is actually difficult to determine with one 2009 estimate having ninety-five jurists, of which only three were Caribbean judges. The primary decision makers in the JCPC's pool are the privy councillors who also serve as judges on the Supreme Court of the United Kingdom and tend to be the only ones listed on the JCPC's website. No Caribbean judges, however, have sat on the JCPC since 2009 when the JCPC was co-located with the new Supreme Court of the United Kingdom.

As a result of the JCPC's employment of a large pool of jurists but usage of only a fraction of them, the JCPC has been criticized for the fact that decisions for any one case often depends on the judges called. The possible combinations of judges available means that different decisions can be rendered for very similar fact patterns in cases. This issue becomes particularly relevant when an appeal comes from a Caribbean country as it may be difficult for judgments to be handed down based on the nuances of Caribbean society when it is unlikely that a majority of judges on the panel for a case would come from the Caribbean. As one Caribbean lawyer lobbyist (initially an opponent of the CCJ) noted: "What is the "reasonable man" test in the Caribbean? Acts of provocation in England and the Caribbean may not be the same....... In the Caribbean, even express words may have different connotations. These are the types of questions that need to be discussed by an indigenous tribunal..."

==== Cost comparisons for litigants and states ====
As comparable appellate courts, the CCJ and JCPC as outlined above have similar procedures, but there are major differences in both the time and money that would need to be spent by individual litigants and states in pursuing cases to either court.

Individual litigants are expected to almost always face reductions in the costs associated with pursuing their cases whenever a switch to the CCJ is made. For instance the cost of filing an appeal with the JCPC is more than five times greater than filing an appeal with the CCJ. For the JCPC, the filing of an application for permission to appeal along with the actual notice of appeal would have cost £220, or roughly US$350 in 2013, while the CCJ requires no payment for filing an application for permission to appeal and the cost for filing a notice of appeal was US$60. In 2015, the new filing fees for the JCPC were noted as ranging from £400 to £5,000 or roughly US$600 to US$7,500 while the comparable fees for the CCJ remained at US$60 thus making the cost of filing an appeal with the JCPC at least ten times greater than filing an appeal with the CCJ.

Although both courts do allow appeals in forma pauperis, waiving filing fees when they are deemed too burdensome on the individual litigant, the JCPC does so on a more limited basis.

Some of the highest costs for litigants however arise when litigation of the case actually begins. In most cases, litigants will have to travel to the United Kingdom (UK) to pursue their cases before the JCPC. This may involve purchasing plane tickets and/or finding and hiring lawyers licensed in the UK. Additionally, Jamaican citizens are required to obtain visas before travelling to the UK, and for these citizens the cost of a UK visa would range from £85 to £737 (or US$131 to US$1,138) depending on the type of visitor visa applied for. Regardless of whether or not a visa is required, all litigants would also have to pay for accommodation and any other necessary expenses in the UK for the duration of the litigation. All of this adds up as a very expensive appeals process; one estimate placed the average total cost between US$57,000 and US$87,500. Given the generally low number of appeals coming from the smaller CARICOM states and sometimes from larger CARICOM states such as Jamaica, in effect the local courts of appeal are the courts of last resort for the majority of CARICOM litigants who cannot afford to take their appeals to the JCPC and must therefore be satisfied with the judgments of the local courts of appeal.

As a result, the JCPC has only really been accessible to either the very wealthy from the Commonwealth Caribbean or to certain inmates on death row who are able to secure pro bono legal service from British barristers. In the case of those nationals, such as Jamaicans, who also require visas in order to travel to the UK to pursue cases before the JCPC, there is the risk that the denial of the visa could negatively impact on the ability for their cases to be heard, thus further reducing potential accessibility (especially if the work load is not sufficient to justify the JCPC travelling to their jurisdiction instead). By contrast, the CCJ, in most cases, is a much less expensive option for litigants in all comparative costs (filing, airfare, accommodations, other expenses, etc.). As the CARICOM has successfully pushed for visa free access by CARICOM nationals (except Haitians for now) to other member states, no citizen of any country that currently has the JCPC as its final court would need to apply for and exhaust financial resources obtaining a visa to travel to the seat of the CCJ or to any other state where the CCJ may sit. And by virtue of distance, travel to the seat of the CCJ in Trinidad and Tobago, is much cheaper than travel to the UK. In fact physical travel to the seat of the CCJ itself in some cases is not necessary as the court itself (like the JCPC) is itinerant and (unlike the JCPC), the CCJ makes extensive use of electronic and teleconferencing facilities to reduce the cost to litigants. The CCJ has an e-filing system (which has been hailed as "impressive") that makes provision for all court filing to be carried out electronically specifically in order to reduce to the cost to litigants of filing documents with the court and to keep its commitment of access to justice for all. The CCJ also utilizes the system to conduct hearings electronically, making use of teleconferencing equipment installed in all contracting states.

It is in the aspect of the CCJ and JCPC itinerancy that the costs to states (and further differences between the CCJ and JCPC) becomes apparent. Although it is not established to operate as an itinerant court, the JCPC has maintained that it is willing to consider sitting outside the UK, but only where it receives an official invitation to do so from the chief judge and the government of the country or territory concerned, and where the full costs of the JCPC (that is airfare, travel, accommodations and other relevant costs) are covered by the hosts, and where there is sufficient work to justify such a visit. Such sufficient work might involve hearing cases from other neighbouring or nearby territories or countries in which case litigants from the other territories would have to incur the cost of travel and litigation to the country actually hosting the JCPC.

By contrast, as expressly provided for in the Agreement establishing the CCJ, the CCJ is willing to sit in any country within its jurisdiction on a case-by-case basis, if doing so is necessary for evidence to be given in person and where video- or teleconferencing technology proves insufficient for the task and where the litigant may not be able to afford to appear before the seat of the court and thus be unable to adequately present his or her own case. When travelling to another country in its jurisdiction the costs are paid for by the CCJ itself including airfare, accommodations and any other expenses. The hosting state is expected to provide a location for the Court to sit (as with the JCPC) and to provide ground transportation and security for the Court (as with the JCPC). Thus far the CCJ has sat on cases in Barbados, Belize, Guyana, Jamaica and in its seat of Trinidad and Tobago.

==== Types of cases heard ====
Due to the differences in costs, the JCPC has only been truly practically accessible to certain death row inmates or very wealthy individuals. Additionally, the JCPC does have jurisdictional limitations unrelated to the cost of appeal. The JCPC functions as a final appellate court in very restricted manner. Under the common law, the right of appeal does not exist for all cases and instead must be specially conferred. This is done consequently as appeals "as of right" and "as of leave" (where leave is required by the local Court of Appeal or the JCPC itself).

Firstly, appeals to the JCPC in civil proceedings lie at the discretion of the local court where the case at hand is one of 'great general public importance or otherwise ought to be submitted to His Majesty in Council for decision' and where an amount or in dispute or claim (including property) is of, or exceeds, the prescribed statutory value. In criminal matters, the JCPC will not intervene unless it can be demonstrated that some serious miscarriage of justice has occurred through violation of the principles of natural justice; violation the due process of law or other serious injustice. This is as a result of the JCPC not being designed to function as a second tier Court of Appeal to review the evidence of a given case.

The structural and practical limitations of JCPC appeals has meant that the range of precedent generated by the highest court for many Caribbean jurisdictions is confined to narrow categories, particularly capital punishment and high finance. The wide body of law between these categories, has often been left mainly to small domestic courts in the Caribbean. Thus different decisions have been more likely to be rendered for similar fact patterns, creating inconsistencies in how laws are interpreted across the region.

The CCJ's structure and appellate jurisdiction, however, address this issue by providing a forum for the creation of jurisprudence in the gap in Caribbean law where the JCPC was never able to rule upon while also ruling on the area of law the JCPC specializes in. In the three years following the CCJ's inauguration, civil appeals petitioned to the court outnumbered criminal appeals by nearly seven to one, with half of the civil appeals coming from appellants the CCJ deemed too poor to pay for the filing costs. By contrast, under the JCPC, civil appeals have never outnumbered criminal appeals. This combination of lower litigant cost for the CCJ, the Court's willingness to grant in forma pauperis and having a wider field of law to hear appeals on has enabled the CCJ to hear types of cases from the region that the JCPC has never known.

Although limited to only four states in its appellate jurisdiction at the moment, so far citizens of those states have been accessing the Court more than they did the JCPC. For Barbados, there were eight appeals heard by the JCPC in the five years immediately prior to Barbados' accession to the appellate jurisdiction of the CCJ. In the five years that followed immediate after the switch to the CCJ, twelve appeals were heard from Barbados. Belize saw appeals roughly twice per year to the JCPC before switching to the CCJ in 2010 and subsequently saw 12 appeals in the four years since the first appeal to the CCJ from Belize in mid 2011. While Guyana originally abolished appeals to the JCPC in 1970, since adopting the CCJ, appeals to that Court have been exponentially increasing.

== History ==
In the aftermath of the collapse of the Federation of the West Indies (and with it the Federal Supreme Court), which had lasted a mere four years, from 1958 to 1962, the Anglophone continental and insular Caribbean states formed the CARIFTA (the Caribbean Free Trade Association), with a view to maintaining an economic link among the various former and continuing colonies of the United Kingdom after the collapse of the political bond. On 1 August 1973, the successor to the CARIFTA, the Caribbean Community, better known by its acronym, CARICOM, came into being.

The founding document of the CARICOM, the Treaty of Chaguaramas, was signed by the so-called "Big Four" states: Barbados, Jamaica, Guyana and Trinidad and Tobago, all of which had gained their political independence from the UK during the 1960s. This signing was the starter's signal for a more mature, though at times slow and halting, process of regional integration among the states of the Commonwealth Caribbean.

=== Revised Treaty of Chaguaramas and Agreement establishing the CCJ ===
In 2001, the Conference of Heads of Government of the Caribbean Community, at their 22nd meeting in Nassau, the Bahamas, signed the Revised Treaty of Chaguaramas (RTC), rebranding the Caribbean Community and Common Market to include the proposed CARICOM Single Market and Economy (CSME). The single market replacing the original Common Market aspect of the group.

Originally an Anglophone club, the admission of Dutch-speaking Suriname in 1995, and Créole-speaking Haiti (where French is the official language) in 2002 has somewhat modified the cultural and jurisprudential mix of the community.

Under the revised Treaty of Chaguaramas, and typical of similar international integrationist movements, the CARICOM has restructured itself to include such elements as are characteristic of the modern democratic state, viz., executive (CARICOM Heads of Government and the Community Council), legislative (Assembly of Caribbean Community Parliamentarians – established before the revised treaty and now moribund) and judicial (CCJ) arms.

The Caribbean Court of Justice (CCJ) is the Caribbean regional judicial tribunal established on 14 February 2001, by the Agreement Establishing the Caribbean Court of Justice. The agreement was signed on that date by the CARICOM states of: Antigua and Barbuda; Barbados; Belize; Grenada; Guyana; Jamaica; Saint Kitts and Nevis; Saint Lucia; Suriname; and Trinidad and Tobago. Two further states, Dominica and Saint Vincent and the Grenadines, signed the agreement on 15 February 2003, bringing the total number of signatories to 12. The Bahamas and Haiti, though full members of the CARICOM, are not yet signatories, and because of Montserrat's status as a British territory, they must await Instruments of Entrustment from the UK in order to ratify. The Agreement Establishing the Caribbean Court of Justice came into force on 23 July 2003, and the CCJ was inaugurated on 16 April 2005 in Port of Spain, Trinidad & Tobago, the seat of the Court.

=== Appellate jurisdiction ===
The birth of the CCJ came after a long and arduous period of planning. In March 1970, the Organisation of Commonwealth Caribbean Bar Associations (OCCBA) first raised the issue of the need to replace the Judicial Committee of the Privy Council as the court of last resort for the Commonwealth Caribbean by a regional court of appeal. Again in Jamaica, in April 1970, at the Sixth Commonwealth Caribbean Heads of Government, the Jamaican delegation tabled a proposal on setting up a regional Court of Appeal and the heads further agreed to take action on relinquishing the Privy Council as the Anglophone Caribbean's final appeal court and mandated a committee of CARICOM attorneys-general to further explore the question of the establishment of what was then being called a "Caribbean Court of Appeal".

Further to the perceived need for an indigenous, regional court as a tribunal of last resort in civil and criminal cases, other factors eventually led to the strong support for the creation of a judicial arm of the CARICOM. In 1972, consideration was being given by the OCCBA for the proposed Caribbean Court of Appeal to serve as both a municipal court of last resort and an international tribunal to adjudicate disputes between CARICOM member states. In 1989 the West Indian Commission established by the CARICOM heads of government endorsed this proposed hybrid jurisdiction without qualification. As Duke Pollard, then director of the Caricom Legislative Drafting Facility, wrote in 2000: "the old Treaty of Chaguaramas provided for arbitration in the event of disputes concerning the interpretation and application of the Treaty. Unfortunately, however, the arbitral procedure was never used and serious disputes were never settled, thereby causing the integration movement to be hampered. Moreover, the rights and obligations created by the CSME are so important and extensive, relating to the establishment of economic enterprises, the provision of professional services, the movement of capital, the acquisition of land for the operation of businesses, that there is a clear need to have a permanent, central, regional institution to authoritatively and definitively pronounce on those rights and corresponding obligations. The Caribbean Court of Justice is intended to be such an authoritative institution."

The official inauguration was held in Queen's Hall, Port of Spain, Trinidad and Tobago, on Saturday 16 April 2005. The first case heard by the CCJ was in August 2005 and was to settle a "decade-long" libel court case from Barbados. Barbados and Guyana acceded to the CCJ's appellate jurisdiction in 2005, with Belize joining them in June 2010, and Dominica in March 2015.

=== Jurisdictional competition with the Privy Council ===
The reasons given for the establishment of a supreme appellate court are many and varied, including a perceived regional disenfranchisement from the Judicial Committee of the Privy Council.

Controversy surrounding the establishment of this court corresponds to two major events that made the Privy Council unpopular in the Caribbean region.

- One reason was the refusal of the Privy Council to allow capital punishment for persons convicted of murder (who had spent more than five years pursuing their various appeal options) to be practiced in Caribbean states, even where a majority of the people in the relevant jurisdictions supported the death penalty. In the 1993 case of Pratt v Attorney General of Jamaica, the Privy Council held that persons imprisoned on death row for more than five years should have their sentences commuted to life imprisonment.
- The second main issue was a case in Antigua and Barbuda, Observer Publications v Matthew, where the Privy Council ruled that the government had acted unlawfully in refusing to consider an application for a broadcast radio station licence. Until the ruling, radio station licences had only been issued to members of the prime minister's family.

The British-based court has been perceived as having too much power in the Caribbean region. Several politicians also lamented that the Caribbean nations are the only remaining region of the former British Empire still to rely on the British court system for appeals.

=== Support from the British legal establishment for the CCJ over the JCPC for the Caribbean ===
Paradoxically, even as some within the Caribbean oppose switching from the Privy Council to the CCJ over fears of lessened impartiality by CCJ judges not as far removed from the region as the Privy Council judges, senior British legal figures (often members of the JCPC itself) have expressed support for a regional court for the Caribbean. As far back as 1828, the man responsible for remodelling the Judicial Committee of the Privy Council, Lord Brougham, had raised the issue of removing colonies from the Privy Council's jurisdiction. He opined that due to the distance of the colonies from the UK and the immense variety of matters arising from them which would be foreign to British habits, that any court in the UK would be extremely inadequate for the colonies.

Lord Brougham's sentiments were echoed nearly 200 years later in 2003 by Lord Hoffman, a Law Lord from 1995 to 2009, when he noted that although the Privy Council had done its best to serve the Commonwealth Caribbean and had effected improvements in the administration of justice, the remoteness of the court from the community served as a handicap. In his own view a local final court would be necessary and beneficial to transform society in partnership with the other two branches of government.

In 1990, Lord Wilberforce (Senior Law Lord from 1975 to 1982) and later in 1992 leading barrister Lord Gifford QC both called on the Commonwealth Caribbean to establish its own regional and final court of appeal. In 1999, then Senior Law Lord Lord Browne-Wilkinson described as burdensome the number of appeals in capital matters coming from the Caribbean to the Privy Council. He noted that such appeals occupied 25% of the Privy Council's time and he felt it was time for the Privy Council to be relieved of the Caribbean cases in order for the region to accede to full legal independence. Browne-Wilkinson also advocated for the establishment of a regional Caribbean court of last resort.

In September 2009, Lord Phillips of Worth Matravers expressed sentiments close to those of Browne-Wilkinson a decade earlier. Phillips, the last Senior Law Lord and first President of the Supreme Court of the United Kingdom, said he would search for ways to curb the "disproportionate" time that he and his fellow senior justices spent on hearing legal appeals from independent Commonwealth countries to the Privy Council. He expressed concern that the new Supreme Court's judges would end up spending as much as 40% of their working time on Privy Council business and was intending to take some pressure off of the Supreme Court judges by drafting in lower tier judges from the Court of Appeal to sit on cases from Commonwealth countries. He also added that in an ideal world former Commonwealth countries would stop utilising the Privy Council and instead set up their own final courts of appeal.

In October 2009, Lord Gifford at a reception in Kingston, Jamaica, again expressed support for the replacement of the Privy Council by the CCJ. Gifford noted that the CCJ would be more accessible, affordable and provide a better quality of justice for Jamaicans and other former British colonies in the Caribbean than the Privy Council. Gifford expressed support for Phillips' earlier comments, and hoped that they would serve to stir Jamaica and other Caribbean states to leave the Privy Council and join the CCJ. Gifford also said that his arguments in support of the CCJ were strictly practical and not based on the Privy Council's composition or being a "colonial relic".

Thus it would seems that for at least some of members of the JCPC, geographical and psychological distance (often raised as necessary for greater objectivity and impartiality) does not seem to be an issue and what is more important is the need for the Caribbean (and other Commonwealth countries) to take care of its own affairs. In fact, the Privy Council has often been willing to accept findings by Caribbean courts on local matters because they recognize that such courts are more familiar with Caribbean matters.

== Composition ==
=== Judges ===
The Caribbean Court of justice currently consists of 7 Judges (including the President), though under the Agreement establishing the court there can be a maximum of 10 Judges including the President. This limit may be increased by the agreement of all of the member states if necessary. The Judges, other than the President, are appointed or removed by a majority vote of the eleven member Regional Judicial and Legal Services Commission (RJLSC), which is also the body which must recommend a need of for an increase in the number of Judges (other than the President) before such an increase can be effected by the agreement of the member states. Removal of a Judge by the RJLSC occurs only after the question of the removal of a Judge has been referred by the RJLSC to a tribunal and the tribunal has subsequently advised that the Judge should be removed for misbehaviour or an inability to carry out the duties of a Judge.

Under the Agreement establishing the court, at least three judges of the full complement of ten are required to possess expertise in international law including international trade law and one judge is also required to be from the civil law tradition similar to such jurisdictions as Haiti and Suriname. Persons being appointed to the office of Judge (including the President) are supposed to have high moral character, intellectual and analytical ability, integrity, demonstrate sound judgment, and an understanding of people and society. The RJLSC appoints persons to be Judges (or recommends persons to be President of the Court) from candidates who have distinguished themselves in their careers either practicing or teaching law for at least fifteen years or being Judges of a court of unlimited jurisdiction in civil and criminal cases for at least five years. The candidates must have practiced or taught law, or been a judge, in at least one of the following:

- a CARICOM member state
- a Contracting Party (i.e. a state which has executed the agreement establishing the CCJ)
- some part of the Commonwealth
- a state exercising civil law jurisprudence common to Contracting Parties

The RJLSC does not and is not allowed to consider potential judges by recommendations from contracting member states, but only by a prospective judge's individual application.

Once a judge is appointed, they are allowed to hold office until the age of 72, but are allowed to continue in office, if necessary for a further three months in order to deliver a judgment or to do any other thing in proceedings that he or she has heard. During the evolutionary phase of the Court (that is until the full complement of 9 Judges plus the President have been appointed), the RJLSC may extend the tenure of a Judge until the age of 75.

As of 10 November 2026:

| State | Members of the Court | President | Judge |
|---|---|---|---|
| Jamaica | Hon. Winston Charles Anderson | 2025– | 2010– |
| Trinidad and Tobago | Hon. Maureen Rajnauth-Lee | | 2015– |
| Belize | Hon. Denys Barrow | | 2017– |
| Trinidad and Tobago | Hon. Peter Jamadar | | 2019– |
| Jamaica | Hon. Chantal Ononaiwu | | 2024– |
| Nigeria/Canada | Hon. Chile Eboe-Osuji | | 2025– |
| Guyana | Hon. Arif Bulkan | | 2025– |

Past Judges:

| State | Members of the Court | President | Judge |
|---|---|---|---|
| Trinidad and Tobago | Hon. Michael de la Bastide | 2005–2011 | |
| Guyana | Hon. Duke Pollard | | 2005–2010 |
| Guyana | Hon. Désirée Bernard | | 2005–2014 |
| Trinidad and Tobago | Hon. Rolston Nelson | | 2005–2017 |
| Saint Kitts and Nevis | Rt Hon. Sir Dennis Byron | 2011–2018 | |
| United Kingdom | Hon. David Hayton | | 2005–2019 |
| Kingdom of the Netherlands | Hon. Jacob Wit | | 2005–2023 |
| Barbados | Hon. Andrew Burgess | | 2019–2025 |
| Saint Vincent and the Grenadines | Hon. Adrian Saunders | 2018–2025 | 2005–2025 |

=== President ===
The President of the CCJ is appointed or removed by the qualified super majority vote of three-quarters of the Contracting Parties on the recommendation of the RJLSC. The President may be removed by the Contracting Parties only on recommendation of the RJLSC and then only after the question of the removal of the President has been referred by the RJLSC to a tribunal and the tribunal has subsequently advised that the President should be removed for an inability to carry out the duties of President or for misbehaviour.

The President serves also as Chairman of the RJLSC and in the Court will preside over hearings and deliberations; direct the Court to sit in such number of divisions as he or she chooses; appoint one or more judges to determine interlocutory matters; and (in consultation with the five other Judges selected by him for the purpose) establish rules for the exercise of the original jurisdiction of the Court and rules for regulating the practice and procedure in the exercise of the appellate jurisdiction of the Court.

The President automatically takes precedence over all other Judges of the Court, with the seniority of the other Judges being determined by the dates of their appointment. In the event that the President is unable to perform the duties of office (or if there is a vacancy in the office of President), the most senior Judge shall perform the role of President and shall be appointed to perform that role by the Chairman of the Conference of Heads of Government of CARICOM until the President can resume those functions or, in the case of a vacancy in the Presidency, until someone has been appointed to and assumes the functions of the office. Where there is no difference in seniority among the Judges, one of the Judges will simply be selected by the Heads of Government to perform the role of President in the event of a vacancy in Presidency or the inability of the President to perform the functions of office.

The President may only serve for one, non-renewable 7-year term or until the age of 72 (whichever is earlier) but is allowed to continue in office, if necessary for a further three months in order to deliver a judgment or to do any other thing in proceedings that he or she has heard. As with the other Judges, during the evolutionary phase of the Court (that is until the full complement of 9 Judges plus the President have been appointed), the RJLSC may extend the tenure of the President until the age of 75 or until seven years in office have been reached, whichever comes first.

=== Regional Judicial and Legal Services Commission ===
The Regional Judicial and Legal Services Commission (the RJLSC or the commission) was established pursuant to Article V(1) of the Agreement Establishing the Caribbean Court of Justice. The commission is composed of the following persons: the President of the Court who is also the chairman of the commission; two persons nominated jointly by the Organisation of the Commonwealth Caribbean Bar Association (OCCBA) and the Organisation of Eastern Caribbean States (OECS) Bar Association; one chairman of the Judicial Services Commission of a contracting state selected in rotation in the English alphabetical order for a period of three years; the Chairman of a Public Service Commission of a contracting state selected in rotation in the reverse English alphabetical order for a period of three years; two persons from civil society nominated jointly by the Secretary-General of the Caribbean Community and the Director General of the OECS for a period of three years following consultations with regional non-governmental organisations; two distinguished jurists nominated jointly by the Dean of the Faculty of Law of the University of the West Indies, the Deans of the Faculties of Law of any of the contracting states and the Chairman of the Council of Legal Education; and two persons nominated jointly by the Bar or Law Associations of the Contracting Parties.

The Commission itself has a number of responsibilities that help to ensure the independence and proper functioning of the CCJ. It is responsible for recommending the candidate to be the next President of the Court; for considering and appointing potential judges for the Court; for appointing the registrar, deputy registrars and other officials and employees as necessary and determining their terms of service and terminating their appointments; for exercising disciplinary control over the judges and starting the process for removing judges based on inability to perform or misbehaviour.

=== Protection from political pressure and influence ===
The framework of the CCJ provides many layers of protection from political pressure and influence in both the appellate and original jurisdictions:

- Original jurisdiction judgments and advisory opinions are delivered as a single judgment with no dissenting or separate concurring opinions or judgments allowed and record of the way judges voted in a majority ruling. This ensures that the judges themselves are insulated from excessive political pressure (especially in cases involving multiple member states) by having their individual decisions remain unknown as the judicial decisions are written as though the court is speaking with a single and collective voice.
- Political pressure is not permitted to reach the judges through member state appointment as occurred in the defunct SADC Tribunal and as occurs in the ECJ and East African Court of Justice. Instead, judges are appointed by the Regional Judicial and Legal Services Commission (RJLSC), an independent 11 person body created expressly for the purpose to decide judicial admission.
- While member states do vote in the selection of the president of the Court, political distance is maintained since it is the RJLSC alone which is responsible for selecting the nominees to the post of president for the member states to vote upon. Member states cannot substitute any nominee and must await a fresh selection by the RJLSC in the event that they fail to approve an appointment for president.
- Even appointment to the RJLSC itself is done by relatively independent jurists, including the deans of the law school at the University of the West Indies and other law schools in the contracting states (jointly responsible for two nominations), as well as the Organisation of the Commonwealth Caribbean Bar Association and the Organisation of Eastern Caribbean States Bar Association (also jointly responsible for two nominations).
- The RJLSC does not consider potential judges by recommendations from contracting member states, but by a prospective judge's individual application.
- Only the RJLSC is responsible for initiating proceedings for the removal of a judge (due to inability to perform or misbehaviour) and for recommending an increase in the number of judicial positions in the court.
- Judges of the Court (including the president) may only be removed (by the RJLSC in the case of other judges or heads of government in the case of the president) by an affirmation of a tribunal specifically established for this purpose.
- While normal judges of the CCJ have life tenure until the age of 72, the president of the Court may only serve for one, non-renewable 7-year term. As a result, all judges of the CCJ (unlike judges in the ECJ or the defunct SADC Tribunal) are free to make decisions without having to consider judicial term renewal. This put a check on the potential for political influence on the CCJ through the president of the Court (who also serves as chairman of the RJLSC), who is appointed by the super majority vote of three-quarters of the contracting states upon the recommendation of the RJLSC as once voted in the president of the Court would not potentially be beholden to the governments of the contracting states to render favourable decisions in order to gain a new term.
- As a unique feature of international and integration courts, the Court is funded through a CCJ Trust Fund which increases the independence of the Court, by preventing direct financial connections between the Court (salaries of the judges, operations of the court, etc.) and the member states and ensures economic stability and certainty for the Court. Pre-empting the possibility of informal political pressure to delivery judgements favourable to any particular government, the Trust Fund is intended to finance the expenditures of the Court through the income from the fund in perpetuity.
- The CCJ Trust Fund is itself administered by a board of trustees drawn from regional entities, many of which are independent of the influence of the governments of member states and represent both private and public interests.
- The CCJ's initial funding was not derived directly from a single member state (and thus risking the possibility of the CCJ being beholden to that member state) but was provided by all contracting states, who were required to submit payment without any influence on how the CCJ Trust Fund utilizes the funds.
- The CCJ Trust Fund cannot solicit or accept any extra donations unless all the member states agree to do so.
- Any decision regarding the fund requires consensus or, failing that, a two-thirds majority.

In January 2020, the Deutsche Gesellschaft für Internationale Zusammenarbeit (GIZ) of Germany, announced the results of a Judicial Integrity Scan that they had conducted on the CCJ. Utilizing the Bangalore Principles of Judicial Conduct and the United Nations Convention against Corruption as a basis for the review, the GIZ endorsed many aspects of the CCJ's structure including the transparency and accessibility of its hearings and judgments; its use of a Code of Judicial Conduct and the high levels of adherence to this Code; the overall design of the Court itself and the RJLSC; and the recruitment and selection process for judges as handled by the RJLSC. It noted however that there was currently a gender imbalance among the judges that should be addressed in future recruitments and that RJLSC could institute a competition complaint filing procedure for unsuccessful applicants hoping to fill any vacancies as judges.

=== CCJ Trust Fund ===
The CCJ is funded through an independent Caribbean Court of Justice Trust Fund. The Trust Fund was developed to promote financial independence of the Court from political interference. It was established with roughly US$100 million from initial contributions of the member states by way of loans from the Caribbean Development Bank and other possible lenders. Select contributions by state were reportedly: Jamaica contributing US$28.7 million, Trinidad and Tobago: USD31.6 million; Barbados: USD13.5 million; and Guyana: USD8.8 million. This income from the fund is expected to finance the expenditures of the Court (remuneration of judges and other employees, operation of the court) in perpetuity and was calculated on a 10-year projection. This keeps the CCJ from depending on the largesse of governments and keeps it free from their administrative control. The CCJ Trust Fund is administered by a board of trustees drawn from various regional bodies including the following persons or their nominees: the secretary-general of the Caribbean Community; the vice-chancellor of the University of the West Indies; the president of the Insurance Association of the Caribbean; the chairman of the Association of Indigenous Banks of the Caribbean; the president of the Caribbean Institute of Chartered Accountants; the president of the Organisation of Commonwealth Caribbean Bar Associations; the chairman of the Conference of Heads of the Judiciary of Member States of the Caribbean Community; the president of the Caribbean Association of Industry and Commerce; and the president of the Caribbean Congress of Labour.

=== Caribbean Community Administrative Tribunal ===
In February 2020 a new Caribbean Community Administrative Tribunal was created with the aim of settling employment disputes for staff at CARICOM's Secretariat and other Institutions which normally (like most international organisations) enjoy immunity from lawsuits in national courts over contract disputes. While the administrative tribunal is constituted as a separate entity with a separate Statute, the administrative tribunal is co-located on the same premises as the CCJ, the RJLSC does play a similar role in constituting the tribunal as it does for the CCJ and in exceptional cases, judgements from the administrative tribunal can be appealed to a Review Committee composed of 5 CCJ Judges.

== Jurisdiction by country and institution ==
=== The Bahamas ===
In 2011, the then Chief Justice of the Bahamas Sir Michael Barnett said The Bahamas should eventually abandon the Privy Council as the final court of appeal and move toward the Caribbean Court of Justice (CCJ). While that decision would be up to the government of The Bahamas, Sir Michael said there is a "powerful argument to moving eventually toward the CCJ".

"Whether we do that now is a matter for political debate and a matter that [the government] will have to discuss and consider", Sir Michael told the Nassau Guardian following the opening ceremony of the Caribbean Association of Judicial Officers Conference.

"I have my own views and I think it’s almost a natural progression of our constitutional development that we move away from the Privy Council and I think the Caribbean Court of Justice is likely to be the alternative to the Privy Council. I think that as a part of our constitutional development it’s almost inevitable that we move away from the Privy Council like lots of other countries, including Australia and New Zealand".

Sir Michael said while the Privy Council has been useful, the CCJ would better serve the country's needs. "It's a regional court but it's also part of our development as a nation that we look to our own court for the resolution of disputes."

Some proponents in The Bahamas wishing to sever links with the Privy Council are in favour of joining the CCJ, perhaps by having a dual final court of appeal system in the country with the Privy Council for civil and commercial matters and the CCJ for criminal matters.

=== Barbados ===
Barbados recognizes the court for original and final jurisdictions. In 2003, the Parliament of Barbados passed its Caribbean Court of Justice Act and the Constitution (Amendment) Act, and they were brought into force by Proclamation on 8 April 2005.

=== Belize ===
Belizean legislation to recognize the CCJ was tied up for some years in partisan politics. In 2007, the People's United Party (PUP)-led government introduced the Caribbean Court of Justice Bill, but due to the opposition of United Democratic Party (UDP) members, it did not achieve the required three-fourths majority. This led to mutual recriminations, with PM Said Musa accusing the UDP of being anti-Caribbean, while the UDP complained of the PUP's attempts to tie the CCJ Bill to the Coast Guard Bill, which the UDP supported. The Belizean general election, 2008 resulted in the UDP taking power; new PM Dean Barrow then tabled the Belize Constitution (Seventh Amendment) Bill, which aside from replacing the Judicial Committee of the Privy Council with the CCJ, would also have removed the prohibition against dual citizens being elected to the National Assembly. This time the PUP blocked passage of the constitutional amendment until the dual citizenship provision was removed; after this was done, the bill passed in February 2010. After the passage of the bill, PM Barrow signed the order in May 2010 to abolish appeals to the Privy Council beginning on 1 June that year.

=== Jamaica ===
The Jamaica Labour Party opposed granting CCJ full powers on the basis that it was a hanging court. In February 2005, the Judicial Committee of the Privy Council declared that the CCJ-related companion bills passed by the Jamaican Parliament in 2004 were unconstitutional and therefore void. The bills would have established the CCJ as the final court of appeal in Jamaica. The Privy Council sided with the appellants, including the Jamaican Council for Human Rights, the Jamaica Labour Party and others, ruling that to establish the CCJ as the country's final appeal court, without it being entrenched in the constitution would undermine the protection given to the Jamaican people by Chapter Seven of the Jamaican constitution. The court concluded that the procedure appropriate for an amendment of an entrenched provision – a referendum – should have been followed.

In January 2012, the new People's National Party government of Jamaica stated that it would be moving to have the CCJ serving in both the original and appellate jurisdictions for Jamaica in time for the 50th anniversary of Jamaica's independence in August. The Jamaica Labour Party, now in opposition, stated it has no issue with the government's plan and seems set to support the move despite strident objections in the past. In February, the foreign affairs minister of Jamaica has also called on Trinidad & Tobago to sign on to the court's appellate jurisdiction to mark that country's 50th anniversary of independence.

In May 2015, the Jamaican House of Representatives approved, with the necessary two-thirds majority, three bills that would end legal appeals to the Privy Council and make the Caribbean Court of Justice as Jamaica's final Court of Appeal. The reform was debated by the Jamaican Senate, however, the government needed the support of at least one opposition senator for the measures to be approved by the required two-thirds majority. The 2016 general election was held without the issue being resolved and resulted in the defeat of the People's National Party government and the election of a new Jamaican Labour Party government, led by Andrew Holness, which opposes implementing the reform without a referendum. Holness's government has promised to hold a referendum on the question.

=== Saint Lucia ===
The Parliament of St. Lucia voted to accede to the appellate jurisdiction of the CCJ on February 28, 2023.

There has been controversy, so an injunction was filed in the Eastern Caribbean Supreme Court after the Constitution of Saint Lucia Amendment Act 2023 was passed

=== Trinidad and Tobago ===
In late 2009, controversy arose over the fact that the CEO of a company involved in CCJ litigation was also the chairman of the Court's trust fund.

In April 2012, the then prime minister of Trinidad and Tobago, Kamla Persad-Bissessar announced in Parliament that it intended to abolish criminal appeals to the Privy Council in favour of the CCJ and would be tabling legislation to that effect. This follows a review of the situation conducted by the government after a commitment given at the last CARICOM heads of government conference in Suriname in July 2011. Although the announcement had the general support of the Opposition leader Dr Keith Rowley, he expressed disappointment that the government was "only going halfway" by planning to adopt the CCJ for criminal appeals only while retaining the Privy Council for civil matters and cautioned that the move may not be legally possible under the relevant treaties. He said the opposition People's National Movement was fully supportive of adopting the CCJ as a final appeals court on all matters, both civil and criminal. It has been observed however that there is a precedent for the partial abolition of appeals to the Privy Council with Canada ending criminal appeals to the court in 1933 and civil appeals in 1949.

=== Other states ===
It is expected that the two Caribbean states that will have the most difficulty accessing the court will be Suriname which has a Dutch-based legal system, and Haiti which has a French-based legal system. All other member states have British-based legal systems with the CCJ itself being predominantly modeled after the British system.

In 2012, following the 54th meeting of the OECS Authority, it was agreed that although all OECS members are committed to acceding to the CCJ's appellate jurisdiction as soon as possible the differing constitutional provisions of each member state meant that simultaneous accession was no longer the preferred option. Dominica and St. Kitts & Nevis are the only members that would be able to take steps to accede to the CCJ's appellate jurisdiction during the course of 2012 as they only require a parliamentary majority to join up to the court. Grenada and Antigua & Barbuda would require referendums before being able to accede, while St. Lucia and St. Vincent & the Grenadines would need a parliamentary majority approving accession along with a judicial resolution.

On 29 January 2015, it was announced that Dominica would become the fourth CARICOM member state to accede to both the original and appellate jurisdictions of the CCJ by early February 2015. This was announced by Prime Minister of Dominica, Roosevelt Skerrit and follows on the formal approval received in 2014 from the British government that was required in order for Dominica to delink from the Privy Council. Dominica acceded to the CCJ in its appellate jurisdiction on 6 March 2015.

In July 2015, the St. Lucian government announced that intended to soon table legislation that would replace the Privy Council with the CCJ. Prime Minister Dr. Kenny Anthony noted that St. Lucia had a provision in its Constitution which was identical to a provision in the Constitution of Dominica which allowed that country to recently join the CCJ. Further noting that St. Lucia's Attorney General had received an advisory opinion from the Court of Appeal to a possible erroneous section that the provision in question had referred to; the Court of Appeal agreed by a 2–1 majority that there was indeed an error in the Constitution. On that basis the government plans to proceed with accession to the CCJ's appellate jurisdiction and it has formally written to the British government advising them that the government of St. Lucia wishes to delink from the Privy Council pursuant to the requirements of that section of the Constitution. Prime Minister Anthony anticipated opposition and possible legal challenges to this move, and stated his government had no problems with that, even suggesting it would be interesting to see what pronouncement the Privy Council would make on the non-binding advisory opinion of the Court of Appeal.

Antigua and Barbuda began taking positive steps towards adopting the CCJ as its final appellate court when it launched a public education campaign on the CCJ in March 2016. The public education campaign and move towards acceding to the CCJ in the appellate jurisdiction has the support of both the Government and the Opposition and is expected to go on for three months ahead of a referendum on the issue likely to be held in June. Additionally three new pieces of legislation would be needed to facilitate the referendum on accession to the appellate jurisdiction – a Constitution Amendment Bill to amend the provisions of the Constitution on the Supreme Court Order, an amendment to the Referendum Act, and an amendment to the Representation of the People Act. Two of these instruments were expected to be submitted to the Parliament for review and voting in late March 2016.

On 20 June 2016, the Parliament of Grenada passed legislation that would allow Grenada to accede to the CCJ's appellate jurisdiction. Before Grenada could accede however the bill needed to be approved by a simple majority in Senate and then be approved by a 2/3 majority referendum. The referendum was held on 24 November that same year, with the amendment voted down, with 56.73% against.

== Seat and itinerancy ==
Article III of the Agreement establishing the CCJ provides that The Seat of the Court shall be in the territory of a Contracting Party as determined by a qualified majority of the Contracting Parties.

In 1999, Trinidad and Tobago signed an Agreement with the Caribbean Community establishing the seat of the CCJ and the offices of the RJLSC in that country. This followed from the decision of the Contracting Parties for Trinidad and Tobago to serve as the headquarters of the court in the 1990s and the promotion by Basdeo Panday (then Prime Minister of Trinidad and Tobago) of the CCJ and his desire to seek agreement with the Opposition to give effect to the Agreement establishing the CCJ and for Trinidad and Tobago to effectively act as the base for the Court.

In 2005, a broadly identical Agreement was signed between Trinidad and Tobago and the newly established CCJ and RJLSC establishing the seat of the CCJ and Offices of the RJLSC in Trinidad and Tobago as was required under Article III of the Agreement establishing the CCJ itself.

While having a seat in Trinidad and Tobago, the Court is also given the authority (under the same Article III of the Agreement establishing the CCJ) to sit, as circumstances warrant, in the territory of any other Contracting Party. This itinerant ability, coupled with the Court's use of electronic and teleconferencing facilities, makes travel to the seat of the Court unnecessary in some cases. This is especially true for cases where litigants may be unable to afford the cost of appearing before the seat of the Court and electronic and teleconferencing facilities are inadequate for the task. As a result of the CCJ's planned self-sufficiency in terms of funding, when the Court sits in another country in its jurisdiction, it pays the cost for travelling, accommodation and other expenses and only requires the host state to provide a location for the Court to sit and to provide security and ground transportation to and from the venue of the sitting. Up to May 2015, the CCJ has sat in Barbados, Belize, Guyana, Jamaica and Trinidad & Tobago. The Court itself views itinerant sittings as important to ensuring that the accessibility of itself and justice in general to the people it serves of the Caribbean Community.

=== Facilities ===
Located at 134 Henry Street, Port of Spain the CCJ's building is open to the public from 8 am to 4 pm weekdays but closed on weekends. Visitors may partake in guided tours of individuals and groups of 20 or less facilitated by the Court. Tours usually last 45 minutes, and include welcome messages, walk throughs the building, courtroom demonstrations, and opportunities to meet the judges and staff of the court.

The Court's four-storey building on at Henry Street was originally intended as a temporary home for the Court and Regional Judicial Legal Services Commission (RJLSC) when the Court and RJLSC were moved there in 2006. Prior to that both the Court and the RJLSC operated from another temporary location, the Unit Trust Corporation Financial Centre (UTC), 82 Independence Square, Port of Spain (with the RJLSC beginning operations there from 1 February 2005 and the Court following its inauguration in April 2005). This was the RJLSC's second temporary home as it had previously operated from 63 Tragarete Road, Port of Spain in facilities rented and furnished by the Trinidad and Tobago government.

The CCJ's building also now houses the CCJ Academy for Law and is expected to house the Caribbean Community Administrative Tribunal (CCAT) which is intended to be an independent institution for resolving employment disputes between employees and CARICOM institutions and their employees (as many of the institutions enjoy immunity from local laws).

== Notable cases and decisions ==
=== Substitution of a right of appeal to the Court in place of the previous right of appeal to the JCPC ===
- Barbados Rediffusion Services Limited v Mirchandani and others [2005] CCJ 1 (AJ): In the very first case to reach the CCJ, the Court granted special leave to appeal to it by the applicant based on the transitional provisions contained in the Caribbean Court of Justice Act, 2003 and the Constitution (Amendment) Act, 2003, passed by the Parliament of Barbados. The Court noted the clear intentions in the transitional provisions that the substitution of a right of appeal to the CCJ in place of the previous right of appeal to the JCPC, should apply to pending proceedings except in the circumstances spelt out in the provisions themselves. Similar to the JCPC, and based on the provisions which allow for special leave to appeal to the CCJ directly as of right in certain limited instances, the Court established that it will grant special leave to appeal if there is an egregious error of law, a substantial miscarriage of justice or real risk that a serious miscarriage of justice will result if the appeal is not fully and finally ventilated before the Court. Sir Henry de B. Forde Q.C., Mr. Hal Gollop and Mr. C. Anthony Audain for the Applicant. Mr. Clement E. Lashley Q.C., Mr. David J.H. Thompson, Ms. Onika E. Stewart and Ms. Shaunita Jordan for the Respondents.

=== Right of registered or incorporated companies to approach the Court directly ===
- Trinidad Cement Limited and TCL Guyana Incorporated v Republic of Guyana [2009] CCJ 1 (OJ): The Court held that for a company to fall within the meaning of the phrase "persons, natural or juridical, of a Contracting Party" of Article 222 of the Revised Treaty of Chaguaramas (RTC) and thus have locus standi, it is sufficient for such a company to be incorporated or registered in a Contracting Party to the Agreement establishing the CCJ. This judgement was made following the decision of the Court to adjourn the application for special leave made by Trinidad Cement Limited and TCL Guyana Incorporated in Trinidad Cement Limited and TCL Guyana Incorporated v Republic of Guyana [2008] CCJ 1 (OJ) to allow the Community and the Member States parties to the RTC the opportunity to make written legal submissions on the issues before making a determination on the application for special leave. This was the first matter to appear before the CCJ in its original jurisdiction. Dr C Denbow SC for the Applicants. Mr D Singh SC for the Respondent.

=== State liability ===
- Trinidad Cement Limited and TCL Guyana Incorporated v Republic of Guyana [2009] CCJ 5 (OJ); 75 WIR 327: The Court accepted the principle that a State may incur non-contractual liability for damages for breach of the Revised Treaty. The Court held that the new single Market based on the rule of law implies the remedy of compensation where rights which enure to individuals and private entities under the treaty are infringed by a Member State. It held however that State liability in damages is not automatic and that it requires demonstration that the treaty provision allegedly breached was intending to benefit the party, that the breach is serious, that there is substantial loss, and that there is a causal link between the breach by the State and the damage or loss to the party. Dr C Denbow SC for the Claimants. Professor K Massiah SC and Mr Kamal Ramkarran for the Defendant.

=== The power to correct any injustice caused by the Court itself ===
- Brown v Moore-Griffith and others (No 2)[2013] CCJ 12 (AJ); 84 WIR 76: The Court accepted the argument by the Applicant that it had an unfettered power to correct any injustice caused by an earlier order it had made. It was an underlying common law principle that courts of final appeal had an inherent power to correct any breach of Natural Justice caused by an earlier hearing of the same final court of appeal, where a party through no fault of their own, had been subject to an unfair procedure. The exercise of that jurisdiction was necessary to ensure justice between litigants and public confidence in the administration of justice. Lalu Hanuman for the Applicant. Clement Lashley QC and Honor Chase for the Respondents.

=== Right of entry by CARICOM Nationals ===
- Myrie v State of Barbados [2013] CCJ 3 (OJ): The Court held that CARICOM nationals had a right to free movement within the Caribbean Community, specifically a right of entry without any form of harassment or impediment, based on the combined effect of Article 45 of the Revised Treaty and a Decision of the Conference of Heads of Government of the Caribbean Community taken at their Twenty-Eighth Meeting in 2007 ("the 2007 Conference Decision"). The Court noted that the 2007 Conference Decision was another step in furthering the fundamental goal of granting Community nationals the right to unrestricted access to, and movement within, the jurisdiction of Member States, subject to public interest considerations. The 2007 Conference Decision entitled every Community national to a "definite entry" of six months upon arrival in another Member State. The Court further noted that both the rights of establishment and of the provision of services, including services in the tourism sector, presume of necessity the right of movement of Community nationals without being obstructed by unreasonable restrictions. The Court further held that where a Community national is refused entry into a Member State on a legitimate ground, that national should be given the opportunity to consult an attorney or a consular official of his or her country or to contact a family member; and that Member States are required to give, promptly and in writing, the reasons for refusing entry to the Community national and to inform the refused national of his or her right to challenge the decision. Ms Michelle Brown and Ms Nancy Anderson for the Claimant. Mr Roger Forde, QC appearing together with Mr Patterson Cheltenham QC, Ms Donna Brathwaite, QC, Dr David Berry and Ms Nargis Hardyal for the Defendant.
- Tomlinson v State of Belize and State of Trinidad & Tobago [2016] CCJ 1 (OJ): The Court fully endorsed its decision in the earlier Shanique Myrie case that the 2007 Conference Decision created a binding obligation on the Member States to allow all CARICOM nationals hassle free entry and stay of six months upon arrival into their respective territories, subject to two exceptions: the right of Member States to refuse entry to "undesirable persons" and their right to prevent persons from becoming a charge on public funds. The Court agreed with the States that homosexuals, as such, cannot be categorised as 'undesirable persons' and concluded that homosexual CARICOM nationals have a right to freedom of movement on the same terms as any other CARICOM national. The Court held however, that Mr. Tomlinson was not in danger of being prejudiced (and the States' obligations were not breached) by the mere existence of statutory provisions in the Immigration Acts of Belize and Trinidad and Tobago for a number of reasons relating to the proper interpretation of those Acts themselves and in conjunction with other relevant legislation including: (1) section 64(1) of Belize's Interpretation Act; (2) section 3(2) of the Caribbean Community Act, 2004 of Belize; (3) the Preamble of the 1976 Constitution of Trinidad and Tobago; (4) section 4 the 1976 Constitution of Trinidad and Tobago; (5) relevant state practice, particularly the 2004 amendment to the Extradition (Commonwealth and Foreign Territories) Act, 1985; (6) the Data Protection Act 2011 of Trinidad and Tobago; (7) section 3 of the Immigration(Caribbean Community Skilled Nationals) Act 1996 of Trinidad and Tobago which requires an immigration officer to permit entry into Trinidad and Tobago of skilled CARICOM nationals who present a skills certificate, "notwithstanding any other written law" (as, for example, section 8 of the Immigration Act); and (7) Article 9 of the Revised Treaty of Chaguaramas as transformed into the domestic law of Trinidad and Tobago through the Caribbean Community Act, 2005. The Court also accepted the argument posited by Trinidad and Tobago, that despite the formal prohibition in section 8 of its Immigration Act, the prohibition does not apply to CARICOM nationals who are homosexual as part of an official policy. The Court however cautioned that member states should strive to ensure that national laws, subsidiary legislation and administrative practices are consistent with, and transparent in their support of, the right of all CARCICOM nationals to move freely. The Court ultimately dismissed Mr Tomlinson's claims against Belize and Trinidad and Tobago and refused the requested remedies. Noting the importance of having novel issues of Community law ventilated before the CCJ, the Court ordered that each party pay its own costs. Mr Douglas Mendes SC, appearing with Mr. Westmin R.A. James and Mr. Imran Ali, Attorneys-at-Law, for the Claimant. Ms Anika Jackson, Solicitor General of Belize, appearing with Mr Nigel Hawke, Deputy Solicitor General and Ms Samantha Matute, Attorneys-at-Law for the first Defendant (the State of Belize) and Mr Seenath Jairam SC, appearing with Mr Wayne D Sturge, Mr Gerald Ramdeen, Mr Kashka Hemans, Ms Deowattee Dilraj-Batoosingh and Ms Lesley Almarales, Attorneys-at-Law for the second Defendant (the State of Trinidad and Tobago).
- Bain v State of Trinidad & Tobago [2019] CCJ 3 (OJ): The Court held that for CARICOM nationals to exercise their important rights to free movement within the Caribbean Community including a right of entry without any form of harassment or impediment, clear documentary evidence of their nationality is required. The Court further held that the onus of proof is on the intended entrant to show forthwith the clear documentary evidence that he or she is entitled to seek entry to another Member State as a CARICOM national with rights under the Revised Treaty. The Court also noted that a person holding dual nationality has two citizenships existing side by side and as such, the exercise of rights attached to one nationality does not eliminate the right to exercise rights attached to the other nationality. Thus the Court did not consider that the Claimant had waived his Treaty rights as a national of a CARICOM State when he presented himself to the Defendant's immigration officials on arrival as a United States national, producing his American passport to support his completed immigration form. The Court found that the presentation of a Driver's Licence or a Voter's Identification Card was not sufficient to provide conclusive evidence of nationality for the purpose of exercising Treaty rights. The Court reasoned that the function of a driver's licence and voter's identification card were to permit driving or voting, respectively, in the issuing territory, not to establish or provide evidence of citizenship. The Court also reasoned that these documents were not machine-readable nor designed to be stamped with dates of entry and exit by immigration officials and further reasoned that a notation in a non-CARICOM passport of birth by the holder in a CARICOM Member State was insufficient as evidence because birth in a country does not automatically evidence citizenship and because such citizenship, even if held at birth, could have been renounced or been stripped away by the government. Mr Ruggles Ferguson, Mr. Ferron Lowe and Mr. Patrick Superville, Attorneys-at-Law, for the Claimant. Mr Rishi P. A. Dass, Ms Sasha Sukhram and Mr Sean Julien, Attorneys-at-Law, for the Defendant.
- Derek Anand Ramsamooj v The State of Suriname and the Caribbean Community [2026] CCJ 2 (OJ): Using the non-binding Charter of Civil Society for the Caribbean Community as interpretative guide with regards to the Revised Treaty and general Community law, the Court determined that a framework of basic human rights must be in place in order for CARICOM nationals to properly exercise their rights to freedom of movement and the provision of services. Specifically in this case, the right of access to a lawyer for an accused person was one of these minimum human rights standards. The Court also found that a provision of the Surinamese domestic criminal law that allowed for the denial of access to a lawyer for an accused violated the right to free movement regardless of nationality and that it would not be possible to use an confession obtained during an unlawful detention without violating Community law. Appearing for the Claimant: Mr Justin Phelps, SC, Mr Navindra Ramnanan, Mr Milton Castelen, and Mr Chase Pegus, Attorneys-at-Law. Appearing for the Defendant: Mr Hans Lim A Po, Attorney-at-Law. Appearing for the Caribbean Community (which participated as amicus curiae): Ms Lisa Shoman, SC, Ms Radha Permanand, and Mr O’Neil Francis, Attorneys-at-Law.

=== Indigenous people's land rights ===
- The Maya Leaders Alliance & others v. The Attorney General of Belize [2015] CCJ 15 (AJ): In a much-awaited decision, on 22 April 2015, the Court affirmed the rights of the Mayan indigenous communities over their traditional lands in Belize. The case concerned the rights to land of the Mayan communities of the Toledo District in southern Belize who have been fighting to their rights over traditional lands recognized and protected before international courts and Belizean courts for the past two decades. The appeal was brought by 25 appellants who are members of the Maya community of the Toledo District. Their appeal before the CCJ arose out of litigation precipitated by an incursion onto farm lands in the Golden Stream village by Mr Francis Johnson, now deceased. While this appeal was being heard by the CCJ in Belize, the Appellants and the Government entered into a Consent Order on 22 April 2015 which recognized that the Maya system of customary land tenure gives rise to property rights within the meaning of the Constitution of Belize. The Consent Order also requires the Government to develop of a mechanism to recognise and protect Maya land rights in consultation with the Maya people. Under the Consent Order, the CCJ was asked to decide whether the Appellants should be granted damages for breach of constitutional rights. The Court found that the Government of Belize breached the Appellants' right to protection of the law by failing to ensure that the existing property regime, inherited from the pre-independence colonial system, recognized and protected Maya land rights. The Court could not find sufficient evidence to support the Appellants' claim for special damages arising out of the Golden Stream incursion, but felt that innovative use should be made of the remedial reparatory action under the Consent Order to grant redress under the Constitution based on the centuries of oppression and marginalisation of the Maya people. Therefore, the Court ordered the Government of Belize to establish a fund of BZ$300,000.00 as a first step towards compliance with its obligations under the Consent Order. Ms Monica Coc Magnusson for the Appellants. Mr Denys Barrow SC, Mr Nigel Hawke and Ms Naima Barrow for the Respondent.

=== Voting rights, procedures and required majorities in Ministerial Councils of CARICOM ===
- Trinidad Cement Limited and others v State of Trinidad & Tobago and others [2019] CCJ 4 (OJ): In a consolidation of four separate cases of a long-running spat involving regional cement manufacturers and cement importers, the Court's decision clarified a number of procedural issues related to the CARICOM's ministerial councils as well Member State obligation to give the Council for Trade and Economic Development (COTED) adequate notice of any decision to revert to the Common External Tariff (CET) from any agreed upon prior derogation from the same. It was held that a Member State did not need approval from COTED for a decision to revert to the CET. It was further held by the Court that as there are 13 Member States who are parties to the Revised Treaty and to the Single Market and Economy established by that treaty, but an additional 2 Member States (The Bahamas and Montserrat) who are members according to the terms of their bilateral agreements with CARICOM which provided for them to remain members of the Community in accordance with the terms and conditions existing immediately prior to the entry into force of the Revised Treaty then the Article 27 right for Members to cast a vote on the decisions of COTED must be read in light of these facts. As such The Bahamas does not have the right to vote on matters such as that which concerned the COTED classification decision as under the arrangements prior to the entry into force of the Revised Treaty it did not participate in or have votes on decisions of the Common Market which preceded the current Single Market. Thus for decisions in COTED the 14 other Member States were entitled to a vote, and for such to decisions to be valid according to Article 29 of the Revised Treaty, at least three-quarters of the votes (that is 11 Members) are needed for the required qualified majority. Mr Reginald T. A. Armour, SC, Mr Gilbert Peterson SC, Mr Gregory Pantin, Mr Miguel Vasquez and Mr Raphael Ajodhia for the first Claimants (Trinidad Cement Limited and Arawak Cement Company Limited) and Mr Allan Wood QC and Ms Symone Mayhew for the second Claimants (Rock Hard Cement Limited and Rock Hard Distribution Limited). Mrs Deborah Peake, SC, Ms Tamara Toolsie, Mr Brent James and Ms. Radha Sookdeo for the first Respondent (State of Trinidad & Tobago) and Ms Donna Brathwaite, QC, and Ms Gayl Scott for the second Respondent (State of Barbados) and Dr Corlita Babb-Schaefer and Mr O’Neil Francis for the third Respondent (The Caribbean Community).

=== Lawfulness of opt-outs and non-reciprocity in regards to the benefits of Community decisions ===
- Lawfulness of opt-outs and the principle of non-reciprocity concerning a decision of the Conference to enlarge the classes of persons entitled to move and work freely in the Community (Request for an Advisory Opinion) [2020] CCJ 1 (OJ) (AO): In a historic judgement, the Court delivered its first ever advisory opinion pursuant to Article 212 of the Revised Treaty of Chaguaramas and the Court's own Rules. Following the request for such an opinion by the Secretary-General of the Community in March 2019 and oral hearings for the case in October 2019, the Court presented its opinion on 18 March 2020. The case centred on two questions that the Conference of Heads of Governments had agreed to ask of the Court at their 30th Inter-Sessional Meeting in February 2019, wherein it was agreed to allow two Member States to opt-out (for a period of five-year) of a recent decision by the Conference to enlarge the categories of skilled CARICOM nationals entitled free movement in Community to include security guards and agricultural workers. The questions were: (1) whether a Member State can, pursuant to the relevant provisions of the Revised Treaty, lawfully opt out of a decision of the Conference to increase the classes of persons entitled to move and work freely in the Community; and (2) whether the principle of non-reciprocity would enable nationals of the opting out Member States to derive the benefits arising from the decision notwithstanding the opt outs. whether the principle of non-reciprocity would enable nationals of the opting out Member States to still derive the benefits accruing under the enlargement decision in regards to the first question, the Court opined that for the specific opt out referred to it was lawful for the two Member States to request it and for the Conference to grant it as the opt outs did not prejudice the fundamental objective of the Community of freedom of movement for skilled nationals. More generally, the Court noted that opt outs can be granted in relation to any decision of any competent Organ of the Community, but that five conditions have to be accounted for in the effective implementation of any opt out. These five conditions were (i) one or more Member States must first request to opt out of a decision, (ii) the decision must be made by a competent Community Organ, (iii) it is the Conference that must agree to the opt out request for relevant decision, even if that decision was taken by another competent Organ, (iv) the Member State opting out can only opt out of the obligations arising from the decision, and (v) the opt out does not prejudice the fundamental objectives of the Community. In regards to the second question, the Court opined that as the general legal order created by the Revised Treaty requires the universal application of the rights and obligations arising out it; and as the relevant Article of the Treaty (Article 27(4)) derogates from the principle of reciprocity by only specifying that a Member State may opt out of the obligations arising from a decision by a competent Community Organ; and that Article 8 of the Revised Treaty requires each Member State to accord to another Member State treatment no less favourable than that accorded to any other third Member State then generally opt outs are to be treated as a non-reciprocal in nature. As a result, more specifically, the Court advised that this principle of nonreciprocity applies so that nationals of the two Member States opting out of the decision to enlarge the categories for freedom of movement who are security guards and agricultural workers are entitled to enjoy the benefits of that decision. Dr Corlita Babb-Schaefer for The Caribbean Community, Ms Dia Forrester for Grenada, Ms Simone Bullen-Thompson for the Federation of St Kitts & Nevis, Ms Carla Brookes-Harris and Dr Vanessa Moe for the State of Antigua & Barbuda, Ms Donna K Brathwaite, QC for the State of Barbados, Mr Andre Sheckleford for the amicus curiae of the University of the West Indies, Mona Campus and Dr David Berry, Mr Westmin James and Ms Nicole Foster for the amicus curiae of the University of the West Indies, Cave Hill Campus.

== See also ==
- Capital punishment by country
- Caribbean Community Administrative Tribunal
- Eastern Caribbean Supreme Court
- Hoge Raad der Nederlanden
- Joint Court of Justice of Aruba, Curaçao, Sint Maarten, and of Bonaire, Sint Eustatius and Saba
- List of Judicial Committee of the Privy Council cases
- Court of Justice of the African Union
- United Nations Commission on International Trade Law
