= 2002 Gibraltar sovereignty referendum =

- 7 November 2002
- On 12 July 2002 the Foreign Secretary, Jack Straw, in a formal statement in the House of Commons, said that after twelve months of negotiation the British Government and Spain are in broad agreement on many of the principles that should underpin a lasting settlement of Spain's sovereignty claim, which included the principle that Britain and Spain should share sovereignty over Gibraltar. Do you approve of the principle that Britain and Spain should share sovereignty over Gibraltar?

Results
Choice	Votes	%
Yes	187	1.03%
No	17,900	98.97%
Valid votes	18,087	99.51%
Invalid or blank votes	89	0.49%
Total votes	18,176	100.00%
Registered voters/turnout	20,678	87.9%

The Gibraltar sovereignty referendum of 2002 was a referendum, called by the Government of Gibraltar and held on 7 November 2002 within the British overseas territory, on a proposal by the UK Government to share sovereignty of the territory between Spain and the United Kingdom. The result was a rejection of the proposal by a landslide majority, with little more than one per cent of the electorate in favour.

== Background ==
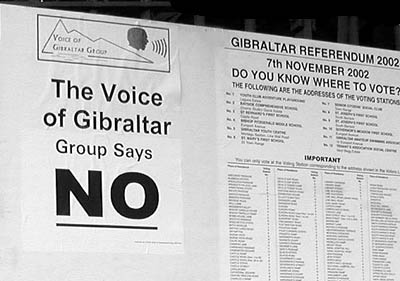
A poster from the campaign

Spain ceded Gibraltar to the British Crown under Article X of the Treaty of Utrecht in 1713. However, Spain disputes the status of Gibraltar and has made numerous attempts to recover the territory, initially by military force and later by economic and diplomatic means. Recovering sovereignty has been a publicly stated objective of successive Spanish governments.

In July 2001, Jack Straw, the British Foreign Secretary, began discussing the future of Gibraltar with Spain. Following secret talks with Spain over the following year, Straw announced in July 2002 that "the UK was willing to share sovereignty of Gibraltar with Spain" and that "the final decision would rest with the people of Gibraltar in a referendum."

The Government of Gibraltar strongly opposed this announcement. They responded by announcing a referendum on the proposal of shared sovereignty with Spain, to be held on 7 November 2002. This pre-empted any plans for a referendum to be held only after the negotiations between Britain and Spain had concluded. Jack Straw described the Gibraltar referendum as "eccentric", and Britain's Foreign Office announced it would not recognise the results.

Although Straw had announced the talks on joint sovereignty, numerous issues remained to be resolved. Firstly, Spain insisted on a time limit, after which full sovereignty would be transferred to Spain. Secondly, Spain would not agree to a referendum in Gibraltar on either joint sovereignty or self-determination. Finally, Spain wanted a greater role than simply joint use of Gibraltar as a military base. Writing in 2009, researcher Peter Gold argued that these disagreements made a final agreement, which would have then instigated a British-run referendum per Straw's July 2002 announcement, only a remote possibility.

== Referendum question ==
The referendum held by the Government of Gibraltar asked voters this question:

On 12 July 2002 the Foreign Secretary, Jack Straw, in a formal statement in the House of Commons, said that after twelve months of negotiation the British Government and Spain are in broad agreement on many of the principles that should underpin a lasting settlement of Spain's sovereignty claim, which included the principle that Britain and Spain should share sovereignty over Gibraltar. Do you approve of the principle that Britain and Spain should share sovereignty over Gibraltar?

Permitted answers were YES or NO, indicated by marking a box with an X.

== Conduct ==
The Government of Gibraltar invited a panel of observers headed by the British MP Gerald Kaufman. Their report stated that "The observers were extremely impressed with the organisation of the referendum and particularly welcome that the role of the observers was integral to the process, as distinct from the more passive role of observers in other elections. The meticulous way in which votes were counted exceeded requirements and went beyond requirements adopted for UK elections".

== Results ==
Speech by Peter Caruana after the announcement of the result of the 2002 referendum

Choice	Votes	%
For	187	1.03
Against	17,900	98.97
Total	18,087	100.00
Valid votes	18,087	99.51
Invalid/blank votes	89	0.49
Total votes	18,176	100.00
Registered voters/turnout	20,678	87.90
Source: Washington Post

== Reactions ==
Peter Caruana, the Chief Minister of Gibraltar, said of the result: "We say to the British Government: Take stock of this referendum result, it's the will of the people of Gibraltar", and that the planned path to joint sovereignty was a "dead end road for everyone".

Reaction in Spain was mostly negative, with El País calling the referendum a "dishonest consultation", while Spanish Minister of Foreign Affairs Ana Palacio described it as "illegal" and "against all the UN resolutions". However, El País also said that "no Spanish Government, neither this one or its predecessors, has done enough to make joint sovereignty or integration with Spain an attractive prospect".

In London, Jack Straw was criticised by the House of Commons Foreign Affairs Committee, stating that he was wrong to agree to joint sovereignty with Spain, when this was unacceptable to the people of Gibraltar. Their report also emphasised the importance of the referendum, which represented the views of Gibraltarians. The Daily Telegraph said "the people of Gibraltar today overwhelmingly rejected the principle of Britain sharing sovereignty of the Rock with Spain".

== Aftermath ==
Prior to the referendum the British Government stated that it would not recognise the outcome. After the referendum the Government of Gibraltar demanded involvement in any further talks with Spain.

Under an initiative originally started in 1999, the Government of Gibraltar, together with opposition parties, negotiated a new Constitution of Gibraltar. The major issue in negotiations was the desire by Gibraltar politicians for a preamble whereby the "British Government ought to commit itself to the question of self-determination in unequivocal terms", which the British government initially resisted." After Margaret Beckett succeeded Straw as Foreign Secretary in 2006, there was a shift in British policy on Gibraltar that effectively recognised the preamble to the 1969 constitution, agreed that any future discussions on sovereignty would need to involve Gibraltar, and would require an improved relationship between Spain and Gibraltar. This compromise led to the Gibraltar Constitution Order 2006, which reduced the powers of the (British-appointed) Governor of Gibraltar and transferred them to local officials, and incorporated a bill of "fundamental rights and freedoms" into the constitution. This reform had cross-party support in Gibraltar, and was submitted to a referendum. The resulting 2006 Gibraltarian constitutional referendum approved these reforms by 60-38%. Although this had cross-party support in Gibraltar, when submitted to a referendum on adoption a significant no vote emerged. Although reasons were diverse, there were two aspects to objections: firstly, the commitment to retaining British sovereignty was seen to not be sufficiently secure; and secondly, the new constitution was deemed not advanced enough in allowing the exercise of the right to self-determination.

== See also ==
- 1967 Gibraltar sovereignty referendum
- 1980 Quebec referendum
- 1995 Quebec referendum
- 1999 Australian republic referendum
- 2008 Tuvaluan constitutional referendum
- 2009 Saint Vincent and the Grenadines constitutional referendum
- 2013 Falkland Islands sovereignty referendum
- 2014 Scottish independence referendum
- Referendum on the United Kingdom's membership of the European Union, 2016
