= 2018 Antiguan constitutional referendum =

- 6 November 2018
- Do you approve the Constitution Amendment Bill 2018, which is a bill for an act to alter the Constitution of Antigua and Barbuda to terminate Her Majesty in Council (also known as the Privy Council) as the final court of appeal for Antigua and Barbuda and to replace it with the Caribbean Court of Justice (also known as the CCJ)?

Results
Choice	Votes	%
Yes	8,509	47.96%
No	9,234	52.04%
Valid votes	17,743	99.78%
Invalid or blank votes	39	0.22%
Total votes	17,782	100.00%
Registered voters/turnout	52,999	33.55%
- Results by constituency

A constitutional referendum was held in Antigua and Barbuda on 6 November 2018, the first referendum in the country's history. The proposed constitutional amendment, which ultimately failed to pass, would have made the Caribbean Court of Justice the final court of appeal, replacing the London-based Judicial Committee of the Privy Council. A quorum of 66.6 % of the valid votes in favour was required for the amendment to be approved.

Grenada also held a referendum on joining the CCJ on the same day; that vote also failed to pass.

== History ==
Whilst a colony of the United Kingdom, Antigua and Barbuda followed the British legal system with the Privy Council being their court of final appeal. Following Antiguan independence in 1981, they opted to retain the Privy Council as the final appeals court. The Caribbean Court of Justice was established in 2001, with the intent of creating a localised Caribbean court of final appeal, with various former British colonies joining it whilst dropping appeals to the Privy Council.

In 2018, the Prime Minister of Antigua and Barbuda, Gaston Browne called the referendum and encouraged Antiguans to vote in favour of it. The opposition United Progressive Party opposed the proposed change and encouraged Antiguans to vote by their consience. Due to the Privy Council as the final court being entrenched in the Constitution of Antigua and Barbuda, a 66% vote in favour was needed to adopt the Caribbean Court of Justice in place of the Privy Council.

== Question ==
Voters were asked to respond YES or NO to the following question:

Do you approve of the Constitution of Antigua and Barbuda (Amendment Bill 2018) which is a bill for an act to alter the Constitution of Antigua and Barbuda to terminate Her Majesty in Council (also known as the Privy Council) as the final Court of Appeal for Antigua and Barbuda and to replace it with the Caribbean Court of Justice (also known as the CCJ)?

== Results and aftermath ==
The final vote tally gave totals of 8,509 for the amendment and 9,234 against. Turnout was 33.6% of the electorate. Therefore the Privy Council was retained. Browne expressed disappointment but accepted the result.

Choice	Votes	%
For	8,509	47.96
Against	9,234	52.04
Total	17,743	100.00
Valid votes	17,743	99.78
Invalid/blank votes	39	0.22
Total votes	17,782	100.00
Registered voters/turnout	52,999	33.55
Source: ABEC

It was initially claimed that it was through the UPP's campaigning that the referendum failed, but it has been pointed out that due to the low turnout of 33.3%, the government's Antigua and Barbuda Labour Party supporters were apathetic to the proposed change.
