= Supreme Court of the Irish Free State =

Former Irish high court

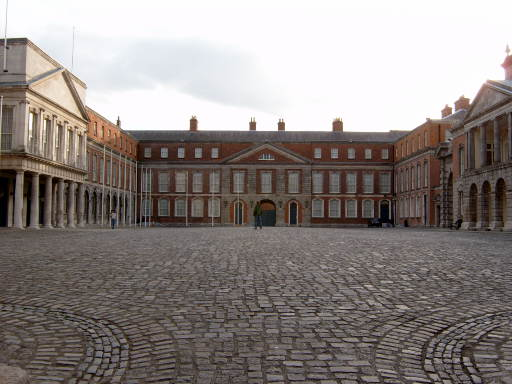
Dublin Castle, the seat of the Supreme Court of the Irish Free State until 1931, when it moved to the Four Courts.

The Supreme Court of the Irish Free State was the state's court of final appeal. It was created in Article 64 of the Irish Free State Constitution. It was presided over by a Chief Justice. The number of judges on the court was laid down in the Courts of Justice Act 1924.

Though the Irish Free State and its constitution were abolished with the commencement of a new constitution, the Constitution of Ireland on 29 December 1937, the Free State Supreme Court continued in existence as the provisional supreme court of the new state until 1961 when the new Supreme Court of Ireland, which had been created in 1937, was formally brought into being.

The Supreme Court of the Irish Free State met in two locations during its existence. Until 1931, while its headquarters, which had been destroyed during the Irish Civil War was being rebuilt, it met in St. Patrick's Hall in Dublin Castle. From 1931 onwards it met in the Four Courts in Dublin.

There was a right of appeal from the Supreme Court to the Judicial Committee of the Privy Council in London until a 1933 constitutional amendment.
