= Caribbean Community Administrative Tribunal =

Administrative Tribunal of the Caribbean Community
Agency overview
- Formed: February 2020

The Caribbean Community Administrative Tribunal, or CCAT, is a tribunal tasked with being the ultimate arbiter of employment disputes for all staff at the CARICOM Secretariat and other CARICOM institutions, as these bodies, being international organizations, are not subject to local laws and national courts. The establishment of the administrative tribunal was approved in February 2019 at the Thirtieth Inter-Sessional Meeting of the CARICOM Heads of Government and its statute adopted.

== Background ==
The need for an administrative tribunal for the employers and employees at regional institutions such as the CARICOM Secretariat and the Caribbean Examination Council (CXC) and the Caribbean Centre for Development Administration (CARICAD), was recognized in 2007 in the lead up to the 2008 legal case Johnson v. CARICAD, AR 2 at the Caribbean Court of Justice (CCJ). Although a draft statute for a CARICOM Administrative Tribunal was proposed in 2009, active work on its establishment gathered steam in 2018 with the support of the then CCJ President, Sir Dennis Byron

As with other international organizations, the CARICOM Secretariat and CARICOM Institutions, are outside the jurisdiction of, and thus immune from being sued within, the court systems of the various member states. An administrative tribunal, then would be in keeping with similar such tribunals established for the United Nations, International Labour Organization, the Council of Europe, the African Development Bank and many other such organizations. The need for such a tribunal became especially important when the CCJ determined that it did not have jurisdiction to hear the matter raised in Johnson v. CARICAD, AR 2, highlighting the gap that then existed in the statutes and other founding documents of CARICOM Institutions with respect to settling employment disputes.

== Structure and function ==
The CCAT will serve as the final dispute resolution forum after all other internal dispute resolution procedures have been exhausted within the eligible organizations (defined in the CCAT Statute as the CARICOM Secretariat and any other CARICOM Institutions provided that the jurisdiction of the CCAT has been accepted by these organizations).

The Tribunal will be seated in Port-of-Spain, Trinidad & Tobago at the premises of the CCJ.

According to the CCAT's Statute, the Tribunal itself will consist of five Members selected by the Regional Judicial and Legal Services Commission (RJLSC) for a four-year term (renewable only once) and must have been qualified to hold high judicial office in a CARICOM Member State (or to currently hold or previously held such office); or be experienced and competent jurisconsults (especially with experience in labour relations) for not less than ten years. Members themselves will have security of tenure and can only be removed from office before the end of their term (unless they die or resign first) by a majority of the other Members and with the approval of the RJLSC and only on grounds of being clearly unsuitable for the role or because of some inability to discharge his or her duties.

The Presidency of the Tribunal rotates among the Members in order of seniority for terms of two years, with the first President being elected by the Members themselves. A major duty of the President of the Tribunal is to convene a panel of three Members (including the President himself/herself unless he/she decides otherwise) to her complaints brought before the Tribunal and to preside over the hearings.

In making a judgement over a case brought before it the CCAT is required, by its Statute, to apply international administrative law principles and fundamental human rights while excluding the national laws of the host countries of the Institutions concerned or of the staff members involved in the case. Judgement themselves are to be done by consensus, or a majority vote where consensus cannot be found and all judgements are to be communicated in writing to complainant and the Institution involved, with the reasons for the judgement clearly outlined.

Judgements made by the CCAT are to be final, except in rare cases where they can be either revised, within a period of ninety days if a party to a case discovers a fact after proceedings which could have had a major influence on the judgement, or appealed to a Review Committee composed of five judges of the CCJ if leave for such an appeal is granted by the Review Committee itself within sixty days of the original judgement.

The Tribunal became operational after at least ten eligible Institutions representing no less than 750 employees acceded to the jurisdiction of the CCAT and any such Institution may withdraw from the jurisdiction of the Tribunal three years after giving written notice of an intention to do so, unless permitted to withdraw sooner by a vote of three quarters of the eligible Institutions under the CCAT's jurisdiction.

Funding of the CCAT is the responsibility of the CARICOM Secretariat and the 18 other CARICOM Institutions according to a formula accounting for recurrent costs (shared equally) and variable costs (of which 20% is shared equally and the remainder according to the number of employees at each institution).

== Members of the tribunal ==
The Tribunal is composed of the following members:

As of 17 November 2026:

State	Members of the Court	President	Judge
Barbados	Patterson Cheltenham, QC	2020–2022	2020–
Belize	Lisa Shoman, SC	2022–	2020–
Trinidad and Tobago	Westmin James		2020–
British Virgin Islands	Dancia Penn, QC		2020–
Saint Kitts and Nevis	J. Emile Ferdinand, QC		2020–

== See also ==
- Administrative court
- Administrative Tribunal of the International Labour Organization
- United Nations Administrative Tribunal
- Caribbean Court of Justice
