= Constitution (Amendment No. 22) Act 1933 =

The Constitution (Amendment No. 22) Act 1933 (act no. 45 of 1933, previously bill no. 49 of 1933) was an Act of the Oireachtas of the Irish Free State amending the Constitution of the Irish Free State which had been adopted in 1922. It abolished the right of appeal from the Supreme Court of the Irish Free State to the Judicial Committee of the Privy Council. It was part of a series of constitutional changes the Fianna Fáil government led by Éamon de Valera had initiated after coming to office in 1932 which reduced the connections between the Irish Free State and the United Kingdom.

The major provisions of the Act were (a) abolishing the right of appeal to the Judicial Committee of the Privy Council (b) providing that it would not be lawful for any person to petition the Judicial Committee of the Privy Council against a decision of an Irish court and (c) applying the abolition retrospectively to existing judgments and appeals in being.

It amended Article 66 by the deletion of the words struck out below and insertion of the words emphasised in bold:

The Supreme Court of the Irish Free State (Saorstát Eireann) shall, with such exceptions (not including cases which involve questions as to the validity of any law) and subject to such regulations as may be prescribed by law, have appellate jurisdiction from all decisions of the High Court. The decision of the Supreme Court shall in all cases be final and conclusive, and shall not be reviewed or capable of being reviewed by any other Court, Tribunal or Authority whatsoever: ~~Provided that nothing in this Constitution shall impair the right of any person to petition His Majesty for special leave to appeal from the Supreme Court to His Majesty in Council or the right of His Majesty to grant such leave.~~ and no appeal shall lie from a decision of the Supreme Court or of any other Court in the Irish Free State (Saorstát Eireann) to His Majesty in Council, and it shall not be lawful for any person to petition His Majesty for leave to bring any such appeal.

The Judicial Committee of the Privy Council recognised in Moore vs Attorney General that the Statute of Westminster 1931 had allowed the Irish Free State to do this unilaterally despite abrogating the Anglo-Irish Treaty.

The Act became obsolete on the repeal of the 1922 Constitution on the adoption of the Constitution of Ireland in 1937, and was repealed by the Statute Law Revision Act 2016.

== See also ==
- Judicial Committee of the Privy Council and the Irish Free State
