= Judicial Committee of the Privy Council and the Irish Free State =

Until 1933, Article 66 of the Constitution of the Irish Free State permitted appeals of decisions of the Supreme Court of the Irish Free State (Note: The Supreme Court was created by statute in 1924, prior to which the 1922 constitution preserved the Court of Appeal in Ireland created in 1877, Article 66 applying to its decisions.) to be made to the Judicial Committee of the Privy Council (JCPC) in London. This was a requirement of the Anglo-Irish Treaty of 1921, which underpinned the creation of the Irish Free State. The treaty specified that the Free State's constitutional status would be the same as Canada, another British Dominion, whose local courts allowed further appeal to the JCPC.

While Article I of the 1921 treaty said the Free State's "constitutional status" would match all the existing Dominions (Canada, Union of South Africa, Australia, New Zealand), Article II said "the relationship of the Crown or the representative of the Crown" to the Free State would match Canada. Although Article II ought to have covered the JCPC, in negotiations on the 1922 Free State constitution, the Lloyd George government allowed the provisional Irish government to use the model of South Africa, a unitary state with fewer JCPC appeals than Canada, a federal state for which the JCPC often heard cases of dispute between federal and provincial governments. Kevin O'Higgins predicted there would "not be two or three appeals in a century, where appeals [would] only be granted in very special cases, raising matters other than purely Irish interests, raising international issues of the first importance".

The Cumann na nGaedheal governments of 1922–32 sought to minimise appeals to the Privy Council as undermining the autonomy of the Free State and giving fuel to its republican opponents. An additional impetus was that JCPC members included former politicians who were now Lords of Appeal, among them prominent unionists Lord Carson, Viscount Sumner, and Viscount Cave. In the event Carson and Sumner recused themselves from Free State cases; however, Cave did not and ruled against Cumann na nGaedheal in several cases. Conversely, Southern Irish unionists regarded the JCPC as a safeguard against tyranny of the majority, a fear which Irish nationalists insisted was unfounded.

Article XII of the 1921 treaty provided for a three-person Irish Boundary Commission to finalise the border between the Free State and Northern Ireland. In 1924, when Craigavon's Stormont government refused to appoint Northern Ireland's commissioner, MacDonald's Westminster government referred to the JCPC the question of whether it could either force Stormont to nominate or make one in its stead. The JCPC corresponded with Cosgrave's Dublin government, which chose to view the matter as internal to the UK and refused to be a party to the deliberations.

At the Imperial Conferences of 1926 and 1930, Cosgrave's governments attempted to secure the abolition of JCPC appeal; although neither conference explicitly agreed to this, the 1930 conference led to the UK Parliament recognising Dominion parliaments as its equals via the Statute of Westminster 1931. In the runup to that UK statute, Cosgrave's government prepared two bills for the Free State Oireachtas (parliament): one to remove Article 66 from the constitution, and the other to make any Supreme Court decision final. The bills had not been introduced by the 1932 general election after which Fianna Fáil came to power after and began removing British and monarchist elements from the constitution. The Constitution (Amendment No. 22) Act 1933 abolished the right of appeal to the JCPC. The JCPC itself ruled in 1935 that the Free State Oireachtas had the power to do so under the Statute of Westminster.

== List of referrals ==
Judicial Committee of the Privy Council cases relating to the Irish Free State
Date (Note: Date of the final JCPC action (denial of leave, issuing of opinion, ruling, etc.))	Case	Legal citations	Type	Justices	Notes
25 July 1923	1. R. (Bowman) v Joseph Healy and Major Thomas William Marshall Fuge; 2. Alexander E. Hull and Co. v Mary Anne McKenna; 3. The "Freeman's Journal" Limited v Follum Traesliberi; 4. The "Freeman's Journal" Limited v Erik Fernstrom	[1923] 57 ILT & SJ 173, 197 [1926] 2 IR 402	Appeal from Court of Appeal in Ireland (leave denied (Note: The petition in Bowman v. Healy was withdrawn rather than denied.))	Haldane, Buckmaster, Parmoor	The first Free State petitions.: 1. Bowman v. Healy appealed the refusal of insurance officer Fuge and umpire Healy to apply the Unemployment Insurance Act 1920 to Inchicore railway works employees laid off during a strike by others on the Great Southern and Western Railway. The state was a party, and Hugh Kennedy appeared at the JCPC with John A. Costello, later his successor as Free State Attorney General. Lionel Curtis, at Kennedy's request, persuaded the JCPC registrar to have that petition heard first of the four listed. The case was withdrawn before decision.; 2. McKenna was hit by a lorry after stepping into the roadway where the footpath was blocked by Hull's hoarding. The lorry driver, Harry Stephens, was a party to the original case but not the appeal petition.; 3. The Freeman's Journal newspaper paid less than the agreed amount for newsprint after a steep fall in global prices.; 4. Similar to Follum, involving a different newsprint supplier.; The decision in cases 2, 3, and 4 (often cited as Hull v. McKenna) was to refuse leave to appeal on the basis that there was no automatic right of appeal and that the questions at issue were internal matters for the Free State.
31 July 1924	In the Matter of the Reference as to the Tribunal under Article 12 of the Schedule appended to the Irish Free State Agreement Act 1922.	Cmd. 2214 (Note: Reprinted in Quekett, Arthur S. (1933). The Constitution Of Northern Ireland. Vol. Part II. Belfast: HMSO. pp. 170-175.; UK National Archives citation CAB 24/168/28 [formerly CP 426 (24)])	Special reference	Dunedin, Blanesburgh, Lawrence Jenkins, Lyman Duff, Adrian Knox	Four questions were submitted in advance and a supplementary question during the JCPC hearing beginning 22 July 1924. The answers were transmitted to the UK government by Maurice Hankey, secretary to the JCPC. The substance was that there was no way "under existing law" to bring the Irish Boundary Commission into being without the co-operation of the Northern Ireland government.
27 December 1925	James O'Callaghan v. Charles O'Sullivan	[1925] 1 IR 90 [1926] 2 IR 586	Appeal from Supreme Court (leave denied)	Cave, Dunedin, Shaw	O'Callaghan contested in forma pauperis his dismissal as parish priest of Eyeries by O'Sullivan, Catholic Bishop of Ardfert and Aghadoe.
27 December 1925	Lynham v Butler	[1925] 2 IR 82	Appeal from Supreme Court (leave granted)	Cave, Dunedin, Shaw	The JCPC granted leave to appeal a Supreme Court ruling on the Land Act 1923, but the Land Act 1926 was rushed through the Oireachtas to make explicit the interpretation given by the Supreme Court judgment, obviating the need for JCPC consideration.
22 June 1926	Martin Fitzgerald v. Commissioners of Inland Revenue	[1926] 2 IR 182, 585	Appeal from Supreme Court (leave denied)	Haldane, Dunedin, Atkinson, Phillimore	A tax case for compensation for damage from the 1916 Rising.
3 May 1927	John Howard Wigg and Robert Oliver Cochrane v The Attorney General of the Irish Free State	1927 UKPC 45; 1927 AC 674	Appeal from Supreme Court (heard; overturned verdict)	Cave, Haldane, Finlay, Dunedin	Questioned the applicability to Free State civil servants who had previously been employed by the Dublin Castle administration of a change to the UK Superannuation Act's civil service scheme effected by a Treasury minute of 20 March 1922. The minute was after the Provisional Government was created on 16 January but before the Irish Free State (Agreement) Act 1922 transferred control of the Irish civil service from 1 April.
13 November 1928	In the matter of certain questions relating to the payment of compensation to Civil Servants under Article X of the Articles of Agreement for a Treaty between Great Britain and Ireland	1928 UKPC 85	Special reference	Reading, Phillimore, Hanworth, Alness, Anglin	Special reference due to the Free State government's refusal to enforce the JCPC decision in the Wigg case. In response to both decisions, the Irish and British governments agreed to amend the 1921 treaty.
10 April 1930	The Performing Right Society, Limited v The Urban District Council of Bray	1930 UKPC 36	Appeal from Supreme Court (heard; overturned verdict)	Sankey, Blanesburgh, Hanworth, Thankerton, Russell	Overturned a 1928 Supreme Court decision that the Copyright Act 1911 had not been carried over from UK to Free State law. In the interim, the Oireachtas had passed the Copyright (Preservation) Act 1929 to replicate the 1911 Act.
10 November 1933	Robert Lyon Moore and others v The Attorney General for the Irish Free State and others [Petition]		Appeal from Supreme Court (leave granted (Note: The JCPC ruling on the 1935 petition was that the Constitution (Amendment No. 22) Act 1933 had annulled the 1933 appeal.))		Moore and the other plaintiffs represented the Erne Fishery Company in a fishing rights case begun in 1925, in which the Supreme Court ruled against the company in 1933. Their appeal to the JCPC was accepted the week before the enactment of the Constitution (Amendment No. 22) Act 1933, which abolished the right to JCPC appeals. Whereas abolition statutes in other Commonwealth countries usually allowed appeals already pending to proceed to the JCPC, the Irish act made no such exception.
6 June 1935	Robert Lyon Moore and others v The Attorney General for the Irish Free State and others [Petition]	1935 UKPC 34; 1935 1 IR 472	Petition (rejected)	Sankey, Atkin, Tomlin, Macmillan, Wright	The petitioners sought a ruling that their 1933 leave to appeal remained valid notwithstanding the subsequent constitutional amendment. Conformant to Irish law that the JCPC no longer had jurisdiction, the Supreme Court refused to transmit the case files to the JCPC and the Attorney-General of the Irish Free State was not represented at its proceedings. The JCPC ruled that it no longer had jurisdiction because the 1933 act was legitimate.
