= 2018 Grenadian constitutional referendum =

- 6 November 2018
- Do you approve the bill for an act proposing to alter the constitution of Grenada cited as constitution of Grenada (Caribbean Court of Justice and renaming of Supreme Court) (Amendment) Bill, 2018?

Results
Choice	Votes	%
Yes	9,848	44.80%
No	12,134	55.20%
Valid votes	21,982	99.46%
Invalid or blank votes	119	0.54%
Total votes	22,101	100.00%
Registered voters/turnout	79,410	27.83%

A constitutional referendum was held in Grenada on 6 November 2018. The proposed constitutional amendment, which voters ultimately rejected, would have made the Caribbean Court of Justice (CCJ) the final court of appeal, replacing the British Judicial Committee of the Privy Council, and renamed the Supreme Court. A slightly different proposal was previously made in a 2016 referendum, but was also rejected by voters.

Antigua and Barbuda also held a referendum on joining the CCJ on the same day; that vote also failed to pass.

== Question ==
Voters were asked to respond YES or NO to the following question:

Do you approve the Bill for an Act proposing to alter the constitution of Grenada cited as Constitution of Grenada (Caribbean Court of Justice and renaming of Supreme Court) (Amendment) Bill 2018?

== Results ==
No votes outstripped yeses by 12,133 to 9,846, on a turnout of 28%. Prime Minister Keith Mitchell, whose government had called the vote, said he was "disappointed" but that he was "in total acceptance of the results".

Choice	Votes	%
For	9,846	44.80
Against	12,133	55.20
Total	21,979	100.00
Valid votes	21,979	99.46
Invalid/blank votes	119	0.54
Total votes	22,098	100.00
Registered voters/turnout	79,410	27.83
Source: St. Lucia News Online
