= David Hayton =

British barrister and former judge

David J. Hayton (b. 1944) is a British barrister and former judge on the Caribbean Court of Justice. He holds an LLB and LLD from Newcastle University, and MA and LLD from the University of Cambridge. From 1973 to 1987 he was a Fellow at Jesus College, Cambridge. From 1987 to 2005 he worked in the School of Law, King's College London and was a leading academic, and some time practising English trust lawyer. Having been a judge on the Caribbean Court of Justice from its establishment in 2005, he retired from the court in July 2019.

== Publications ==
- David Hayton, Paul Mathews, Charles Mitchell, Underhill and Hayton's Law of Trusts and Trustees (LexisNexis,18th ed, 2010)

== See also ==
- English trust law
