= Boyce v R =

Case which upheld death sentence for murder in Barbados

- Arms of the Judicial Committee of the Privy Council
- Court: Judicial Committee of the Privy Council
- Full case name: Lennox Ricardo Boyce and Jeffrey Joseph, Appellants v The Queen, Respondent
- Decided: 7 July 2004
- Citations: [2004] UKPC 32, [2005] 1 AC 400, [2004] 3 WLR 786

Case history
- Prior action: Court of Appeal of Barbados

Case opinions
- Lord Hoffman

Keywords
- Capital punishment; inhuman or degrading punishment

Boyce v R is a 2004 Judicial Committee of the Privy Council (JCPC) case which upheld the law that sets out a mandatory sentence of death for murder in Barbados.

== Background ==
The JCPC held in some cases, the law that makes capital punishment mandatory for murder will violate the prohibition on "inhuman or degrading punishment" in the Constitution of Barbados. (This principle is consistent with the 2002 JCPC cases of Hughes, Fox, and Reyes.) However, because (1) the Constitution of Barbados disallows itself to act to invalidate laws that existed prior to the enactment of the constitution, and (2) the law in question pre-dated the constitution, the mandatory death provisions of the law could not be invalidated and must be upheld.

In Matthew v S, which was released on the same day, the JCPC applied the same principles to a similar law in Trinidad and Tobago.

== See also ==
- Judiciary of Barbados
- Attorney General of Barbados
- Supreme Court of Judicature (Barbados)
