= Entrenchment =

Entrenchment, Entrenched or Entrench may refer to:

- A trench
- Entrenchment (fortification), a type of fortification
- Military trenches with relation to Trench warfare, especially that of World War I
- An entrenchment clause within a constitution, a clause impervious to or somewhat shielded from the amendment process.
- Entrenchment hypothesis, in financial theory
- The process forming an Entrenched river, a process of erosion
- Entrench (album), a 2013 album by the Canadian band KEN mode

== See also ==
- Entrenched: Prologue, a 2019 film by Ray Gallardo
