= Pratt v A-G for Jamaica =

Judicial committee in Jamaica

- Arms of the Judicial Committee of the Privy Council
- Court: Judicial Committee of the Privy Council
- Full case name: Earl Pratt and Ivan Morgan, Appellants v The Attorney General for Jamaica and The Superintendent of Prisons, Saint Catherine's, Jamaica, Respondents
- Decided: 2 November 1993
- Citations: [1993] UKPC 1, [1994] 2 AC 1

Case history
- Prior action: Court of Appeal of Jamaica

Case opinions
- Lord Griffiths

Keywords
- Capital punishment; inhuman or degrading punishment

Pratt v A-G for Jamaica is a 1993 Judicial Committee of the Privy Council (JCPC) case in which it was held that it was unconstitutional in Jamaica to execute a prisoner who had been on death row for 14 years. The JCPC held that because the Constitution of Jamaica prohibits "inhuman or degrading punishment", excessive delays cannot occur between sentencing and execution of the punishment. In cases of such excessive delay, the death sentence should be commuted to life imprisonment.

The JCPC held that any delay of more than five years between sentencing and execution was prima facie evidence that carrying out the sentence would constitute inhuman or degrading punishment. It suggested that the entire appeals process in Jamaica should take no more than two years, and that any further applications to the United Nations Human Rights Council should take no more than 18 months.

A later decision clarified that the "five year rule" only applied to the time actually on death row, i.e. "the principle in Pratt was established in response to the specific problem of unacceptable periods of delay on death row and was not meant to be extended to address the wholly different problem of pre-trial delay."
