= R v Hughes =

Trilogy of UK cases on the constitutionality of the capital punishment

Arms of the Judicial Committee of the Privy Council

R v Hughes, Reyes v R and Fox v R were a trilogy of closely related cases considered by the Judicial Committee of the Privy Council (JCPC), with the appeals heard together and the decisions released simultaneously on the 11 March 2002. The cases dealt with the constitutionality of the capital punishment in the Commonwealth Caribbean countries of Saint Lucia, Belize and Saint Kitts and Nevis respectively.

Reyes concerned a man who, during a conflict over a fence, shot his neighbour and the neighbour's wife, then unsuccessfully attempted suicide. Fox involved British bodybuilder Bertil Fox, who in 1998 was convicted of the double murder of his former fiancée and her mother the previous year.

In all three cases it was held that mandatory death penalty was contrary to prohibitions on inhuman punishment, and thus unconstitutional.

However, this conclusion doesn't necessarily apply in all of the Caribbean Commonwealth as the 2004 cases JCPC of Boyce v R (Barbados) and Matthew v The State (Trinidad and Tobago) found for the constitutionality of the death penalty in those countries.
