= Secretariat of the Caribbean Community =

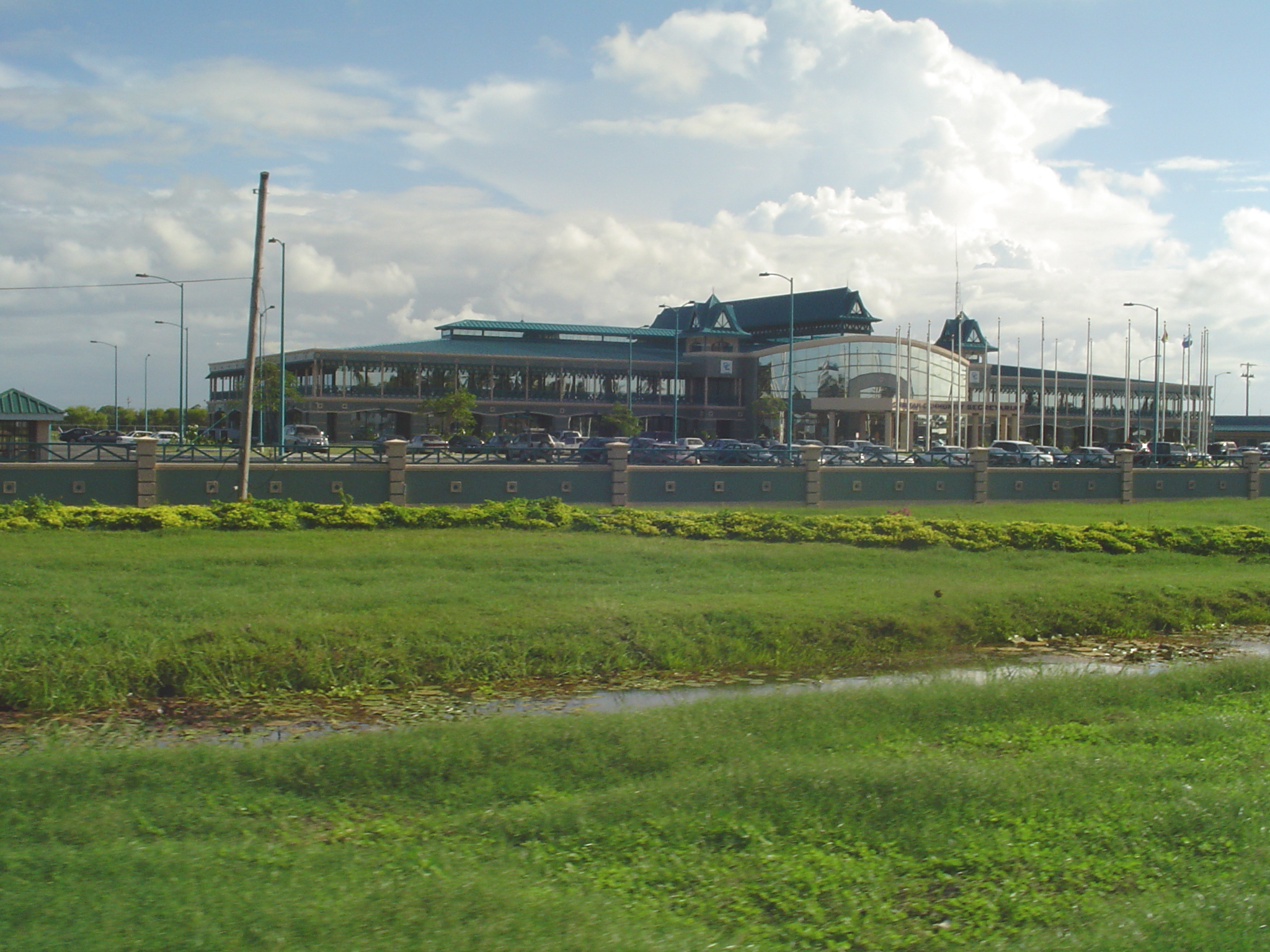
- Secretariat of the Caribbean Community Headquarters

- Location within Guyana

General information
- Location: Turkeyen, Georgetown, Guyana
- Coordinates: 6.82024°N 58.11685°W
- Construction started: May 2001
- Completed: 19 February 2005

The Secretariat of the Caribbean Community is the principal administrative organ for the Caribbean Community (CARICOM) and is headed by the secretary general, who is the chief executive officer of the community.

The mission statement of the secretariat is: "To provide dynamic leadership and service in partnership with Community Institutions and groups, toward the attainment of a viable, internationally competitive and sustainable Community, with improved quality of life for all."

== Headquarters ==
The original home of the CARICOM Secretariat (and its precursor the CARIFTA Secretariat) was at Colgrain House (specifically the southern half of the building, while the northern half was used as the residence of the secretary-general) on Camp Street, Georgetown, Guyana.

With the financial assistance of the governments and people of Japan and India. Ground was broken for a new CARICOM Secretariat headquarters on 25 February 1998, at Liliendaal/Turkeyen. The firm selected to undertake construction was the firm of S. Alimuddin Mohammed (S.A.) Nabi & Sons. Construction commenced May 2001 and on 19 February 2005 the building was officially commissioned in an inauguration ceremony. The building was officially handed over to the CARICOM Secretariat on 15 July 2005 and the secretariat commenced operations in the building on 26 July 2006. The headquarter complex serves the information needs of the secretariat staff as well as the general public.

== Budget ==
In 2017 the allocated budget for the CARICOM secretariat by member governments of the region amounted to EC$55 Million.

== Intergovernmental organization ==
The secretariat comprises the following:

Offices

- Secretary-General
- Deputy Secretary-General
- General Counsel

Directorates

- Foreign and Community Relations
- Human and Social Development
- Regional Trade and Economic Integration

Together these positions comprise the Executive Management of the Organisation and are responsible for the strategic management and direction of the Organisation and for working closely with the councils and their Chairpersons to promote the implementation of decisions.

== See also ==
- Caribbean Community Administrative Tribunal
- List of Commonwealth heads of government
- CARICOM heads of government
- CARICOM Committee of Ambassadors
