= Matthew v The State =

Judicial Committee of the Privy Council case

Matthew v S
- Arms of the Judicial Committee of the Privy Council
- Court: Judicial Committee of the Privy Council
- Full case name: Charles Matthew, Appellant v The State, Respondent
- Decided: 7 July 2004
- Citations: [2004] UKPC 33, [2005] 1 AC 433, [2004] 3 WLR 812

Case history
- Prior action: Court of Appeal of Trinidad and Tobago

Case opinions
- Lord Hoffman

Keywords
- Capital punishment; inhuman or degrading punishment

Matthew v S is a 2004 Judicial Committee of the Privy Council (JCPC) case which upheld the law that sets out a mandatory sentence of death for murder in Trinidad and Tobago.

== Background ==
In this case, the appellant was convicted of murder and sentenced to death. Upon conviction, the appellant appealed the mandatory arguing the death penalty charges were against the Constitution and international law.

The JCPC held in some cases, the law that makes capital punishment mandatory for murder will violate the prohibition on "inhuman or degrading punishment" in the Constitution of Trinidad and Tobago. (This principle is consistent with the 2002 JCPC cases of Hughes, Fox, and Reyes.) However, because (1) the Constitution of Trinidad and Tobago disallows itself to act to invalidate laws that existed prior to the enactment of the constitution, and (2) the law in question pre-dated the constitution, the mandatory death provisions of the law could not be invalidated and must be upheld.

In Boyce v R, which was released on the same day, the JCPC applied the same principles to a similar law in Barbados. Matthew overruled and declared as wrongly decided the November 2003 JCPC decision of Roodal v S, which interpreted the Constitution of Trinidad and Tobago as invalidating the law on mandatory capital punishment for murder.
