= Judicial Committee of the Privy Council =

Judicial body in the United Kingdom

- Arms as used by the Judicial Committee of the Privy Council
- Interactive map of Judicial Committee of the Privy Council
- 51°30′01.3″N 0°07′41.3″W
- Established: 14 August 1833
- Jurisdiction: List of countries: Antigua and Barbuda; The Bahamas; Grenada; Jamaica; St. Kitts and Nevis; St. Vincent and the Grenadines; Tuvalu; Cook Islands; Niue; Isle of Man; Jersey; Alderney; Sark; Guernsey; Anguilla; Bermuda; British Virgin Islands; Cayman Islands; Falkland Islands; Gibraltar; Montserrat; Saint Helena; Ascension; Tristan da Cunha; Turks and Caicos; Pitcairn Islands; British Antarctic Territory; British Indian Ocean Territory; South Georgia and the South Sandwich Islands; Akrotiri and Dhekelia; Mauritius; Trinidad and Tobago; Kiribati; Brunei Darussalam; United Kingdom
- Location: Middlesex Guildhall, City of Westminster, London, England
- Coordinates: 51°30′01.3″N 0°07′41.3″W
- Authorised by: Judicial Committee Act 1833; Judicial Committee Act 1844
- Website: jcpc.uk

The Judicial Committee of the Privy Council (JCPC) is the highest court of appeal for the Crown Dependencies, the British Overseas Territories, some Commonwealth countries and a few institutions in the United Kingdom. Established on 14 August 1833 to hear appeals formerly heard by the King-in-Council, the Privy Council formerly acted as the court of last resort for the entire British Empire except for the United Kingdom itself.

Formally a statutory committee of His Majesty's Most Honourable Privy Council, the Judicial Committee consists of senior judges who are privy counsellors; they are predominantly justices of the Supreme Court of the United Kingdom and senior judges from the Commonwealth of Nations. Although it is often simply referred to as the "Privy Council", the Judicial Committee is only one constituent part of the Council. In Commonwealth realms that retain the JCPC as the final court of appeal, appeals are nominally made to "His Majesty in Council" (i.e. the British monarch as formally advised by his privy counsellors), who then refers the case to the Judicial Committee for "advice". In republics in the Commonwealth of Nations that retain the JCPC as their final court of appeal, appeals are made directly to the Judicial Committee itself. The panel of judges (typically five) hearing a particular case is known as "the Board". The report of the Board is, by convention, always accepted by the King-in-Council as judgement.

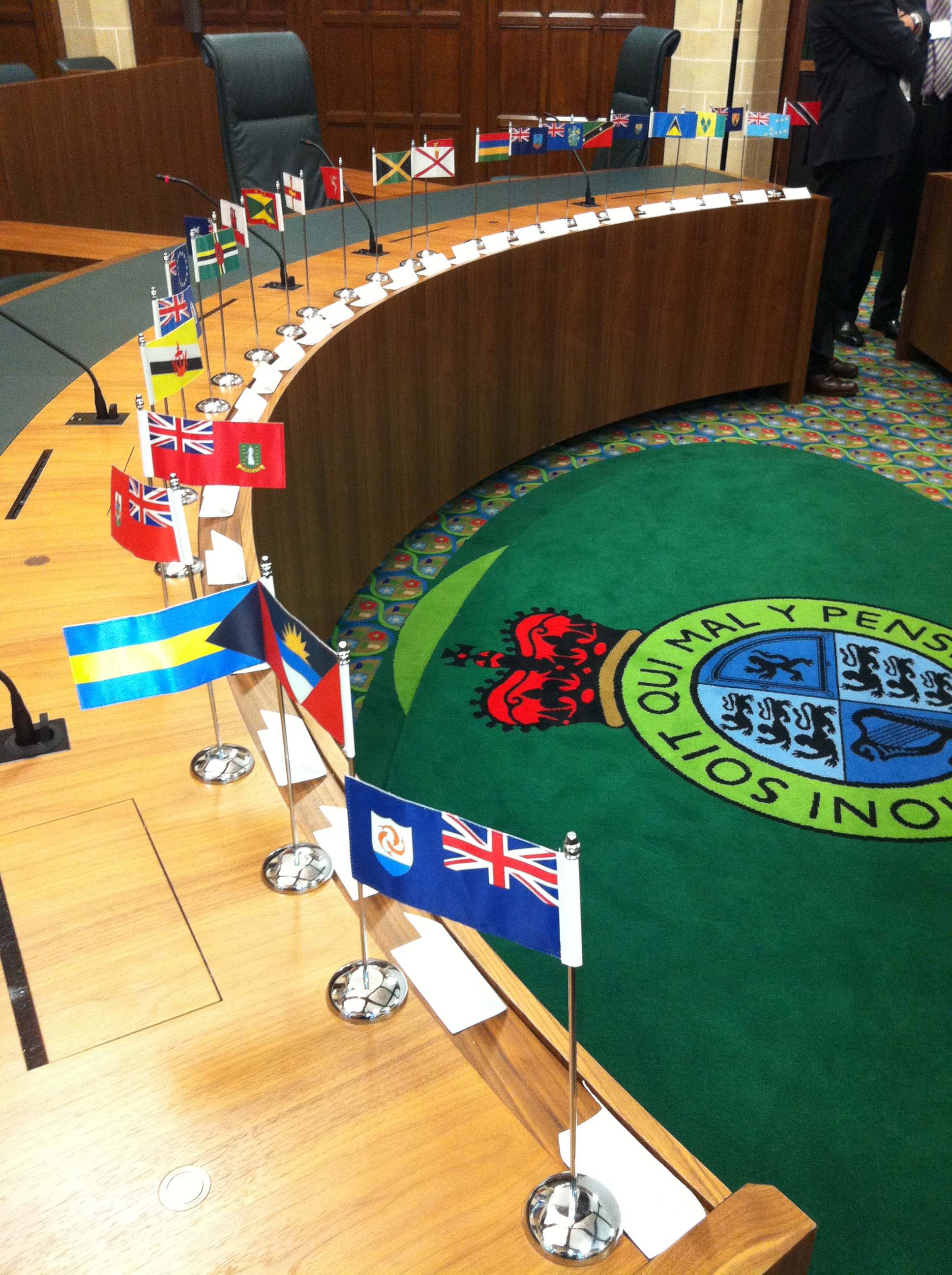
Court 3 in Middlesex Guildhall, the normal location for Privy Council hearings

== History ==
The origins of the Judicial Committee of the Privy Council can be traced back to the curia regis, or royal council. In theory, the king was the fount of justice, and petitions for redress of wrongs arising from his courts were addressed to him. That power was gradually taken over by Parliament (which evolved out of the curia regis) within England, but the King-in-Council (which also evolved out of the curia regis) retained jurisdiction to hear petitions from the King's non-English possessions, such as the Channel Islands and, later on, from England's colonies.

The task of hearing appeals was given to a series of short-lived committees of the Privy Council. In 1679, appellate jurisdiction was given to the Board of Trade, before being transferred to a standing Appeals Committee of the Privy Council in 1696. The Appeals Committee of the Privy Council was one of the earliest judicial bodies which exercised the power of judicial review, in a series of cases from the American colonies which raised questions about the constitutionality of colonial statutes, measured against the royal charters which set out the powers of the colonial governments.

By the early nineteenth century, the growth of the British Empire had greatly expanded the appellate jurisdiction of the Privy Council, which in turn had put great strains on the existing arrangements. The Appeals Committee had to hear cases arising from a variety of different legal systems in the colonies. In a major speech in the House of Commons in 1828, Henry Brougham pointed out that the committee heard appeals from some jurisdictions with Dutch law, some with Spanish law, some with French law, and some with Hindu law, with which its members were unfamiliar. Even in colonies which used English law, there were also local statutes and variations, so that no colony had the same law.

Another serious problem was that the Appeals Committee was technically a committee of the whole of the entire Privy Council, of which a minimum of three were required for a quorum. Many members of the Privy Council were not lawyers but had an equal right to sit on appeals with legally trained members. There was no requirement that any of the Privy Counsellors actually hearing a particular appeal had to be a lawyer. Bishops could sit on matters involving the Church of England. It became possible for certain parties to appeal to secure desired judgements by persuading nonlawyer Privy Counsellors to attend the hearings on their appeals.

The Judicial Committee was also under-resourced. In his 1828 speech in the House of Commons, Brougham pointed out that in the twelve years up to 1826, the committee sat just nine days a year. For these reasons, the Appeals Committee fell into disrepute among better-informed lawyers and judges in the colonies.

In 1833, Brougham became the Lord Chancellor. At his instigation, Parliament passed the Judicial Committee Act 1833 (3 & 4 Will. 4. c. 41).The act established the Judicial Committee of the Privy Council, a statutory committee of the Privy Council that would hear appeals to the King-in-Council. In addition to colonial appeals, later legislation gave the Judicial Committee appellate jurisdiction over a range of miscellaneous matters, such as patents, ecclesiastical matters, and prize suits. At its height, the Judicial Committee was said to be the court of final appeal for over a quarter of the world.

In the twentieth century, the jurisdiction of the Judicial Committee of the Privy Council shrank considerably, as British dominions established their own courts of final appeal and as British colonies became independent, although many retained appeals to the Privy Council post-independence. Canada abolished Privy Council appeals in 1949, India and South Africa in 1950, Australia in 1986, and New Zealand in 2003. Currently, eleven Commonwealth countries outside of the United Kingdom retain Privy Council appeals, in addition to various British and New Zealand territories. The Judicial Committee also retains jurisdiction over a small number of domestic matters in the United Kingdom, reduced by the creation of the Supreme Court of the United Kingdom in 2009.

== Jurisdiction ==
=== Domestic jurisdiction ===
The United Kingdom does not have a single highest national court; the Judicial Committee is the highest court of appeal in some cases, while in most others the highest court of appeal is the Supreme Court of the United Kingdom. (In Scotland the highest court in criminal cases is the High Court of Justiciary; the Supreme Court is the highest court in civil cases and matters arising from Scottish devolution, the latter previously having been dealt with by the Judicial Committee.)

The Judicial Committee of the Privy Council has jurisdiction in the following domestic matters:

- Appeals against schemes of the Church Commissioners (who control the estate of the Church of England).
- Appeals from the ecclesiastical courts (the Arches Court of Canterbury and the Chancery Court of York) in non-doctrinal faculty cases.
- Appeals from the High Court of Chivalry.
- Appeals from the Court of Admiralty of the Cinque Ports.
- Appeals from prize courts or High Court in matters concerning prize
- Appeals from the Disciplinary Committee of the Royal College of Veterinary Surgeons.
- Disputes under the House of Commons Disqualification Act 1975.

Additionally, the government may (through the King) refer any issue to the committee for "consideration and report" under section 4 of the Judicial Committee Act 1833.

The Judicial Committee of the Privy Council is the court of final appeal for the Church of England. It hears appeals from the Arches Court of Canterbury and the Chancery Court of York, except on matters of doctrine, ritual or ceremony, which go to the Court of Ecclesiastical Causes Reserved. By the Church Discipline Act 1840 (3 & 4 Vict. c. 86) and the Appellate Jurisdiction Act 1876 all archbishops and bishops of the Church of England became eligible to be members of the Judicial Committee.

Prior to the coming into force of the Constitutional Reform Act 2005, the Privy Council was the court of last resort for devolution issues. On 1 October 2009 this jurisdiction was transferred to the new Supreme Court of the United Kingdom.

==== Authority of Privy Council decisions in domestic British courts ====
Judgments of the Judicial Committee are not generally binding on courts within the United Kingdom, having only persuasive authority, but are binding on all courts within any other Commonwealth country which still allows for appeals to the Judicial Committee. Where a binding precedent of the UK Supreme Court, or of the House of Lords, or of the Court of Appeal conflicts with that of a decision of the Judicial Committee on English law, English courts are required to follow the domestic decision over that of the Judicial Committee except when the Judicial Committee has in its decision expressly directed the domestic court to follow its new decision. However, given the overlap between the membership of the Judicial Committee and of the Supreme Court, the decisions of the former are extremely persuasive and usually followed.

=== Overseas jurisdiction ===
The Judicial Committee holds jurisdiction in appeals from the following 32 jurisdictions (including eleven independent nations):

Jurisdiction	Type of jurisdiction	Appeals to
Anguilla	British Overseas Territory	His Majesty in Council
Bermuda	British Overseas Territory	His Majesty in Council
British Virgin Islands	British Overseas Territory	His Majesty in Council
Cayman Islands	British Overseas Territory	His Majesty in Council
Falkland Islands	British Overseas Territory	His Majesty in Council
Gibraltar	British Overseas Territory	His Majesty in Council
Montserrat	British Overseas Territory	His Majesty in Council
Saint Helena	British Overseas Territory	His Majesty in Council
Ascension	British Overseas Territory	His Majesty in Council
Tristan da Cunha	British Overseas Territory	His Majesty in Council
Turks and Caicos	British Overseas Territory	His Majesty in Council
Pitcairn Islands	British Overseas Territory	His Majesty in Council
British Antarctic Territory	British Overseas Territory	His Majesty in Council
British Indian Ocean Territory	British Overseas Territory	His Majesty in Council
South Georgia and the South Sandwich Islands	British Overseas Territory	His Majesty in Council
Akrotiri and Dhekelia	British Overseas Territory	His Majesty in Council
Isle of Man	Crown Dependency	His Majesty in Council
Jersey	Crown Dependency	His Majesty in Council
Guernsey	Crown Dependency	His Majesty in Council
Alderney	Parts of the Bailiwick of Guernsey	His Majesty in Council
Sark	Parts of the Bailiwick of Guernsey	His Majesty in Council
Antigua and Barbuda	Commonwealth Realm	His Majesty in Council
The Bahamas	Commonwealth Realm	His Majesty in Council
Grenada	Commonwealth Realm	His Majesty in Council
Jamaica	Commonwealth Realm	His Majesty in Council
St. Kitts and Nevis	Commonwealth Realm	His Majesty in Council
St. Vincent and the Grenadines	Commonwealth Realm	His Majesty in Council
Tuvalu	Commonwealth Realm	His Majesty in Council
Cook Islands	States in Association with a Commonwealth Realm (New Zealand)	His Majesty in Council
Niue	States in Association with a Commonwealth Realm (New Zealand)	His Majesty in Council
Brunei Darussalam	Independent Commonwealth monarchy	The Sultan as head of state; only civil cases are under the jurisdiction of the Judicial Committee. (Note: By agreement with the United Kingdom the Judicial Committee hears cases in which such an appeal has been made, and reports back to him.)
Mauritius	Republic in the Commonwealth of Nations	Directly to the Judicial Committee.
Trinidad and Tobago	Republic in the Commonwealth of Nations	Directly to the Judicial Committee.
Kiribati	Republic in the Commonwealth of Nations	Directly made to the Judicial Committee, some cases only. (Note: Only cases involving certain constitutional rights of Banabans and/or the Rabi Council are under the jurisdiction of the Judicial Committee.)

=== Jurisdiction removed ===
Judicial appeal of final resort has been assumed by other bodies in some current and former Commonwealth countries:

Country	Date	Abolishing statute	New court of final appeal	Notes
Irish Free State	1933	Constitution (Amendment No. 22) Act 1933	Supreme Court	Main article: Judicial Committee of the Privy Council and the Irish Free State Name changed to Ireland by 1937 Constitution. Left the Commonwealth via the Republic of Ireland Act in 1949. Supreme Court reconstituted in 1961.
Canada	1949	An Act to Amend the Supreme Court Act, S.C. 1949 (2nd sess.), c. 37, s. 3.	Supreme Court of Canada	Criminal appeals ended in 1933.
India	1949	Abolition of Privy Council Jurisdiction Act, 1949	Federal Court	Replaced by the Supreme Court on 28 January 1950.
Newfoundland	1949	An Act to Amend the Supreme Court Act, S.C. 1949 (2nd sess.), c. 37, s. 3.	Supreme Court of Canada	Right of appeal continued after Newfoundland joined Canada, until abolished by the federal government for all of Canada
South Africa	1950	Privy Council Appeals Act, 1950	Supreme Court Appellate Division	Replaced by the Supreme Court of Appeal in 1997.
Pakistan	1950	Privy Council (Abolition of Jurisdiction) Act, 1950	Federal Court	Replaced by the Supreme Court under the 1956 Constitution.
Ghana	1960	Constitution (Consequential Provisions) Act 1960	Supreme Court	
Tanganyika	1962	Appellate Jurisdiction Act, 1962	East African Court of Appeal	
Nigeria	1963	1963 Constitution	Supreme Court	
Kenya	1964	Constitution of Kenya (Amendment) Act, 1965	East African Court of Appeal	
Malawi	1965	Constitution of Malawi (Amendment) Act, 1965	Supreme Court of Appeal of Malawi	
Uganda	1966	1966 Constitution	East African Court of Appeal	Criminal and civil appeals ended in 1964.
Australia	1968	Privy Council (Limitation of Appeals) Act 1968	High Court	Abolished appeals of cases originating in federal and territory courts.
Lesotho	1970	Court of Appeal and High Court Order 1970	Court of Appeal of Lesotho	
Sierra Leone	1971	1971 Constitution	Supreme Court	
Ceylon	1971	Court of Appeal Act No. 44 of 1971	Court of Appeal	
Malta	1972	Constitution of Malta (Amendment) Act, 1972	Constitutional Court of Malta	
Guyana	1973	Constitution (Amendment) Act 1973	Court of Appeal of Guyana	Criminal and civil appeals ended in 1970. Since 2005 the Caribbean Court of Justice hears appeals from Guyana's Court of Appeal.
Botswana	1973	Judicial Committee (Abolition of Appeals) Act 1973	Court of Appeal	
Malaysia	1985	Constitution (Amendment) Act 1983; Courts of Judicature (Amendment) Act 1984	Supreme Court	The Supreme Court was called the Federal Court until the 1985 change and reverted to the old name in 1994.
Australia – state courts: New South Wales; Queensland; South Australia; Tasmania; Victoria; Western Australia	1986	Australia Act 1986	High Court	Abolished appeals of cases originating in state courts.
Fiji	1987	Fiji Judicature Decree 1987	Court of Appeal	
Singapore	1994	Judicial Committee (Repeal) Act 1994	Court of Appeal	
The Gambia	1998	1997 Constitution of the Gambia	Supreme Court	A restructure of the Gambian judiciary by Yahya Jammeh, which made the Supreme Court of The Gambia the highest court instead of being below the Court of Appeal of the Gambia as was the case under the 1970 Constitution of the Gambia.
New Zealand	2004	Supreme Court Act 2003	Supreme Court	
Barbados	2005	Constitution (Amendment) Act, 2003	Caribbean Court of Justice	
Belize	2010	Belize Constitution (Seventh Amendment) Act, 2010	Caribbean Court of Justice	
Dominica	2015	Constitution of Dominica (Amendment) Act, 2014	Caribbean Court of Justice	
Saint Lucia	2023	Constitution of Saint Lucia (Amendment) Act, 2023	Caribbean Court of Justice	

The following countries or territories did not retain the jurisdiction of the Judicial Committee at the time of independence or of the transfer of sovereignty from the United Kingdom: Burma (1948), Israel (1948), Somaliland (1960), Cyprus (1960), Zanzibar (1963), Zambia (1964), Rhodesia (1965), South Yemen (1967), Swaziland (1968), Papua New Guinea (1975), Seychelles (1976), Solomon Islands (1978), Vanuatu (1980), Hong Kong (1997).

== Composition ==
=== Members ===
The following are members of the Judicial Committee:

- Justices of the Supreme Court of the United Kingdom (before the establishment of that court in 2009, the Lords of Appeal in Ordinary)
- Other Lords of Appeal (senior judges) from within the United Kingdom
- Privy Counsellors who are (or have been) judges of the Court of Appeal of England and Wales, the Inner House of the Court of Session in Scotland, or of the Court of Appeal in Northern Ireland
- Judges of certain superior courts in Commonwealth nations, who are appointed Privy Counsellors for the purpose of sitting in the JCPC

The bulk of the Committee's work is done by the Supreme Court Justices, who are paid to work full-time in both the Supreme Court and the Privy Council. Overseas judges may not sit when certain UK domestic matters are being heard, but will often sit when appeals from their own countries are being heard.

=== Registrars ===
- Henry Reeve, 1853–1887
- Denison Faber, 1st Baron Wittenham, 1887–1896
- Sir Thomas Raleigh, 1896–1899
- Edward Stanley Hope, 1899–1909
- Sir Charles Henry Lawrence Neish, 1909–1934
- Colin Smith, 1934–1940
- Lieutenant-Colonel John Dallas Waters, 1940–1954
- Aylmer J. N. Paterson, 1954–1963
- Leslie Upton, 1963–1966
- Eric Mills, 1966–1983
- D. H. O. Owen, 1983–1998
- John Watherston, 1998–2005
- Mary Macdonald, 2005–2010
- Louise di Mambro, 2011–2022
- Laura Angus 2022–present
- Celia Cave 2023–present

Until 1904 the Registrar of the Admiralty court was also Registrar to the Judicial Committee of the Privy Council in ecclesiastical and maritime causes.

== Procedure ==
Most appeals to the Judicial Committee of the Privy Council are formally appeals to "His Majesty in Council". Appeals from Brunei are formally to the Sultan and Yang di-Pertuan, while appeals from republics within the Commonwealth are directly to the Judicial Committee. Appeals are generally by leave of the local Court of Appeal, although the Judicial Committee retains discretionary power to grant leave to appeal as well.

After hearing an appeal, the panel of judges which heard the case (known as "the Board") issues its decision in writing. For appeals to His Majesty in Council, the Board submits its decision to the King as advice for his consideration. By convention, the advice is always accepted by the King and given effect via an Order in Council.

Historically, the Judicial Committee could only give a unanimous report, but since the Judicial Committee (Dissenting Opinions) Order 1966, dissenting opinions have been allowed.

The Judicial Committee is not bound by its own previous decisions, but may depart from them in exceptional circumstances if following its previous decisions would be unjust or contrary to public policy.

== Location ==
The Judicial Committee of the Privy Council is based in London. From its establishment to 2009, it mainly met in the Privy Council Chamber in Downing Street, although increase in the Judicial Committee's business in the twentieth century required it to sit simultaneously in several panels, which met elsewhere. The Chamber, designed by John Soane, was often criticised for its interior design, and was extensively remodelled in 1845 by Sir Charles Barry. On 1 October 2009, the Judicial Committee moved to the former Middlesex Guildhall building, which had been refurbished in 2007 to provide a home for both the JCPC and the newly created Supreme Court of the United Kingdom. In this renovated building, Court 3 is used for Privy Council sittings.

In recent years, the Judicial Committee has occasionally sat outside of London. Between 2005 and 2010, it sat twice in Mauritius and three times in The Bahamas.

== Decline in Commonwealth appeals ==
Initially, all Commonwealth realms and their territories maintained a right of appeal to the Privy Council. Many of those Commonwealth countries that became republics, or which had indigenous monarchies, preserved the Judicial Committee's jurisdiction by agreement with the United Kingdom. However, retention of a right of appeal to a court located overseas, made up mostly of British judges who may be out of tune with local values, has often come to be seen as incompatible with notions of an independent nation's sovereign status, and so a number of Commonwealth members have ended the right of appeal from their jurisdiction. The Balfour Declaration of 1926, while not considered to be lex scripta, severely limited the conditions under which the Judicial Committee might hear cases:

From these discussions it was clear that it was no part of the policy of His Majesty's Government in Great Britain that questions affecting judicial appeals should be determined otherwise than in accordance with the wishes of the part of the Empire primarily affected

=== Australia ===
In 1901, the Constitution of Australia limited appeals from the new federal High Court of Australia to the Privy Council, by prohibiting appeals on constitutional matters unless leave is granted by the High Court on inter se questions. Appeals on non-constitutional matters were not prohibited, but the federal Parliament of Australia had the power to legislate to limit them. The right of appeal from federal courts (including territory supreme courts) was abolished through the Privy Council (Limitation of Appeals) Act 1968. Appeals from state courts, a continuation of the right to appeal decisions of colonial courts before 1901, continued, until they were also abolished by the Australia Act 1986, which was enacted by both the UK and Australian parliaments, on the request of all the state governments. The Australian Constitution retains the provision allowing the High Court of Australia to permit appeals to the Privy Council on inter se questions. However, the only time such permission was given was in 1912 and the High Court has stated that it will not grant it again, since the jurisdiction to do so "has long since been spent", and it is obsolete.

=== Canada ===
Canada created its own Supreme Court in 1875 and abolished appeals to the Privy Council in criminal cases in 1933. Despite this, some decisions by the Supreme Court of Canada went on to appeal in the JCPC, including notably the Persons Case (Edwards v Canada (AG)), which affirmed that women had always been "qualified persons" under the British North America Act, 1867 (Canada's Constitution) eligible to sit in the Senate of Canada. In this case, it also used a metaphor in the obiter dicta, later reinterpreted and employed by the Supreme Court of Canada in the 1980s to establish what came to be known as the "living tree doctrine" in Canadian Constitutional law, which says that a constitution is organic and must be read in a broad and liberal manner so as to adapt it to changing times.

In 1949, all appeals to the Privy Council were abolished, but prior to this, there were several factors that served to limit the effectiveness of measures to reduce appeals:

- Appeals of rulings from the various provincial courts of appeal could still be made directly to the Privy Council, without first going to the Supreme Court of Canada.
- In Cushing v. Dupuy (1885), the Privy Council held that the ability to grant special leave to appeal to the Privy Council was unaffected, as the prerogative of the Crown cannot be taken away except by express words.
- In Nadan v The King (1926), the Privy Council ruled that the provision of the Criminal Code barring appeals to the Privy Council was ultra vires of the Parliament of Canada as it was contrary to s. 2 of the Colonial Laws Validity Act 1865.

Nadan, together with the King–Byng Affair, was a major irritant for Canada and provoked the discussion at the 1926 Imperial Conference which led to the Balfour Declaration, which declared the United Kingdom and the dominions to be

... autonomous Communities within the British Empire, equal in status, in no way subordinate one to another in any aspect of their domestic or external affairs, though united by a common allegiance to the Crown, and freely associated as members of the British Commonwealth of Nations.

With that Declaration and its statutory confirmation in the Statute of Westminster 1931 (Imp, 22–23 Geo 5, c.4) the impediment to abolishing appeals to the Privy Council, whether or not it had been legitimate, was comprehensively removed. Criminal appeals to the Privy Council were ended in 1933. Moves to extend the abolition to civil matters were shelved during the growing international crisis of the 1930s but re-tabled after the Second World War, and civil appeals ended in 1949, with an amendment of the Supreme Court Act. Cases begun before 1949 were still allowed to appeal after 1949, and the final case to make it to the Council was not until 1959 with the case of Ponoka-Calmar Oils v Wakefield.

The JCPC played a controversial role in the evolution of Canadian federalism in that, whereas some Fathers of Confederation in negotiating the union of the British North American colonies against the backdrop of the American Civil War wished to ensure a strong central government vis-à-vis relatively weak provinces, appeals to the JCPC in constitutional matters progressively shifted the balance in favour of the provinces. While a few commentators have suggested that Canadian First Nations retain the right to appeal to the Privy Council because their treaties predate their relationship to Canada, the JCPC has not entertained any such appeal since 1867 and the dominant view is that no such appeal right exists.

=== Caribbean Community ===
The nations of the Caribbean Community voted in 2001 to abolish the right of appeal to the Privy Council in favour of a Caribbean Court of Justice (CCJ). Some debate between member countries and also the Judicial Committee of the Privy Council had repeatedly delayed the court's date of inauguration. As of 2005, Barbados replaced the process of appeals to Her Majesty in Council with the CCJ, which had then come into operation. The Co-operative Republic of Guyana also enacted local legislation allowing the CCJ to have jurisdiction over their sovereign final court of appeals system. Belize acceded to the Appellate Jurisdiction of the CCJ on 1 June 2010. As it stands, a few other CARICOM states appear to be ready for the abolition of appeals to the Judicial Committee of the Privy Council in the immediate future. The government of Jamaica in particular had come close and attempted to abolish appeals to the Judicial Committee without the support of the opposition in Parliament; however, it was ruled by the Judicial Committee of the Privy Council that the procedure used in Jamaica to bypass the opposition was incorrect and unconstitutional. Another attempt will also be forthcoming.

Caribbean governments have been coming under increased pressure from their electorates to devise ways to override previous rulings by the JCPC such as Pratt v A-G (Jamaica, 1993), R v Hughes (Saint Lucia, 2002), Fox v R (Saint Kitts and Nevis, 2002), Reyes v R (2002, Belize), Boyce v R (Barbados, 2004), and Matthew v S (Trinidad and Tobago, 2004), all of which are Privy Council judgements concerning the death penalty in the Caribbean region.

The then President of the Supreme Court of the United Kingdom, Lord Phillips of Worth Matravers, has voiced displeasure with Caribbean and other Commonwealth countries continuing to rely on the British JCPC. During an interview, Phillips was quoted by the Financial Times as saying that "'in an ideal world' Commonwealth countries—including those in the Caribbean—would stop using the Privy Council and set up their own final courts of appeal instead".

On 18 December 2006, the Judicial Committee made history when for the first time in more than 170 years it ventured outside London, holding a five-day sitting in The Bahamas. Lords Bingham of Cornhill, Brown of Easton-under-Heywood, Carswell and Scott of Foscote, and Baroness Hale of Richmond, travelled to The Bahamas for the special sitting at the invitation of Dame Joan Sawyer, then the President of the Court of Appeal of the Bahamas; the Committee returned to The Bahamas in December 2007 for a second sitting. On the latter occasion, Lords Hope of Craighead, Rodger of Earlsferry, Walker of Gestingthorpe, and Mance, and Sir Christopher Rose, heard several cases. At the end of the sitting, Lord Hope of Craighead indicated that there may be future sittings of the Committee in The Bahamas, and the Committee has indeed sat in the Bahamas again, in 2009.

The 2018 Antiguan constitutional referendum saw the proposal to replace the JCPC with the CCJ rejected by a 52.04% majority.

On 28 February 2023, the parliament of Saint Lucia approved the Constitution of St Lucia Amendment Bill 2023, which would replace the JCPC with the CCJ.

An injunction against Saint Lucia's accession to the CCJ was filed on 3 March 2023 against the bill in the Eastern Caribbean Supreme Court in the High Court of Justice of Saint Lucia, and is currently pending.

=== Sri Lanka (Ceylon) ===
Sri Lanka, formerly Ceylon, abolished appeals to the Privy Council under the Court of Appeal Act, 1971, which came into effect on 15 November 1971. Previously, the Privy Council had ruled in Ibralebbe v The Queen that it remained the highest court of appeal in Ceylon notwithstanding the country's independence as a dominion in 1948.

=== The Gambia ===
The Gambia retained the right of appeal to the Judicial Committee of the Privy Council under the Gambia Independence Act 1964, even after The Gambia became a republic in the Commonwealth of Nations in April 1970 under Sir Dawda Jawara. Appeals were still taken to the JCPC from 1994 to 1998, when Yahya Jammeh, the then dictator and President of the Gambia decided to restructure the Gambian judiciary under the 1997 Constitution of the Gambia to replace the JCPC with the Supreme Court of the Gambia.

The last case from The Gambia to the JCPC was West Coast Air Limited v. Gambia Civil Aviation Authority and Others UKPC 39 (15 September 1998).

=== Grenada ===
Grenadian appeals to the Privy Council were temporarily abolished from 1979 until 1991, as a result of the Grenadian Revolution, which brought Prime Minister Maurice Bishop to power. People's Law 84 was enacted to this effect. In 1985, Mitchell v DPP affirmed Grenada's right to unilaterally abolish appeals to the Privy Council. In 1991, Grenada restored the JCPC's jurisdiction.

In 2016, there was a proposal in the 2016 Grenadian constitutional referendum to terminate appeals from Grenada to the JCPC and to replace the JCPC with the Caribbean Court of Justice. This was rejected by a 56.73% majority, which means the JCPC remains Grenada's highest court.

Another referendum, the 2018 Grenadian constitutional referendum also rejected terminating appeals to the JCPC by a 55.2% majority.

=== Guyana ===
Guyana retained the right of appeal to the Privy Council until the government of Prime Minister Forbes Burnham passed the Judicial Committee of the Privy Council (Termination of Appeals) Act 1970 and the Constitution (Amendment) Act 1973.

=== Hong Kong ===
Hong Kong's court system changed following the transfer of sovereignty from the United Kingdom to China on 1 July 1997, with the Court of Final Appeal serving as the highest judicial authority of the Special Administrative Region (SAR), and (pursuant to Article 158 of the Basic Law, the constitutional instrument of the SAR) the power of final interpretation vested not in the Court of Final Appeal of Hong Kong but in the Standing Committee of the National People's Congress of China, which, unlike the Judicial Committee of the Privy Council, is a political, legislative body rather than an independent and impartial tribunal of last resort.

Decisions of the Privy Council on Hong Kong appeals before 1 July 1997 remain binding on the courts of Hong Kong. This accords with the principle of continuity of the legal system enshrined in Article 8 of the Basic Law. Decisions of the Privy Council on non-Hong Kong appeals are of persuasive authority only. Such decisions were not binding on the courts in Hong Kong under the doctrine of precedent before 1 July 1997 and are not binding today. Decisions of the House of Lords before 1 July 1997 stand in a similar position. It is of the greatest importance that the courts of Hong Kong should derive assistance from overseas jurisprudence, particularly from the final appellate courts of other common law jurisdictions. This is recognised by Article 84 of the Basic Law.

=== India ===
India retained the right of appeal from the Federal Court of India to the Privy Council after the establishment of the Dominion of India. Following the replacement of the Federal Court with the Supreme Court of India in January 1950, the Abolition of Privy Council Jurisdiction Act 1949 came into effect, ending the right of appeal to the Judicial Committee of the Privy Council.

The Supreme Court of India was inaugurated on 28 January 1950, at which point it took over the appellate functions from the Privy Council.

=== Irish Free State ===
The right of appeal to the Privy Council was provided for in the Constitution of the Irish Free State until its abolition in 1933 by an Act of the Oireachtas of the Irish Free State, amending said constitution.

In Moore v Attorney-General of the Irish Free State the right of the Oireachtas to abolish appeals to the Privy Council was challenged as a violation of the 1921 Anglo-Irish Treaty. The then Attorney General for England and Wales (Sir Thomas Inskip) is reported to have warned the then Attorney-General of the Irish Free State (Conor Maguire) that the Irish Free State had no right to abolish appeals to the Privy Council. The Judicial Committee of the Privy Council itself ruled that the Irish Free State Government had that right under the Statute of Westminster 1931 (Imp.).

=== Jamaica ===
In May 2015, the Jamaican House of Representatives approved, with the necessary two-thirds majority, bills to end legal appeals to the Judicial Committee of the Privy Council and make the Caribbean Court of Justice Jamaica's final court of appeal. The reform will be debated by the Jamaican Senate; however, the government needed the support of at least one opposition Senator for the measures to be approved by the required two-thirds majority. The 2016 general election was called before the reforms could be brought to the Senate for a final vote. The Jamaican Labour Party, which opposed the changes, won the election and has promised to hold a referendum on the issue.

=== Malaysia ===
Malaysia abolished appeals to the Privy Council in criminal and constitutional matters in 1978, and in civil matters in 1984.

=== New Zealand ===
New Zealand was the last of the original dominions to remove appeals to the Privy Council from its legal system. Proposals to abolish appeals to the Privy Council in New Zealand were first put forward in the early 1980s.

The Privy Council's respect for local decisions was noted by Lord Brightman in 1985 in regard to the possible adoption of a New Zealand decision, in the case of Archer v. Cutler (1980), as a precedent, (Note: In Archer v. Cutler [1980] 1 NZLR 386 the New Zealand court had ruled that "a contract made by a person of insufficient mental capacity was voidable at his option not only if the other party knew of or ought to have appreciated his unsoundness of mind, but also if the contract 'was unfair to the person of unsound mind'".) where he stated that:

If Archer v. Cutler is properly to be regarded as a decision based on considerations peculiar to New Zealand, it is highly improbable that their Lordships would think it right to impose their own interpretation of the law, thereby contradicting the unanimous conclusions of the High Court and the Court of Appeal of New Zealand on a matter of local significance. If, however, the principle of Archer v. Cutler, if it be correct, must be regarded as having general application throughout all jurisdictions based on the common law, because it does not depend on local considerations, their Lordships could not properly treat the unanimous view of the courts of New Zealand as being necessarily decisive.

In October 2003, with respect to all cases heard by the Court of Appeal of New Zealand, New Zealand law was changed to abolish appeals to the Privy Council, after the end of 2003. The old system was replaced by the Supreme Court of New Zealand. In 2008, Prime Minister John Key ruled out any abolition of the Supreme Court and return to the Privy Council.

However, judgement on the last appeal from New Zealand to be heard by the Judicial Committee of the Privy Council was not delivered until 3 March 2015.

=== Newfoundland ===
Newfoundland was one of the original Dominions, recognised in the Balfour Declaration and the Statute of Westminster 1931. Like the other Dominions, an appeal lay from the Newfoundland courts to the Judicial Committee.

In 1949, Newfoundland joined Canada as the tenth province. Like other provinces, an appeal continued to lie from the Newfoundland courts to the Judicial Committee. In late 1949, the federal Parliament abolished appeals to the Judicial Committee from courts in Canada, making the Supreme Court of Canada the final court of appeal. Cases started prior to the abolition could still be appealed to the Judicial Committee, but it does not appear that there were any cases from Newfoundland to the Judicial Committee after 1949.

=== Pakistan ===
The Dominion of Pakistan retained the right of appeal to the Privy Council from the Federal Court of Pakistan until the Privy Council (Abolition of Jurisdiction) Act, 1950 was passed. The Federal Court of Pakistan remained the highest court until 1956, when the Supreme Court of Pakistan was established.

=== Rhodesia ===
Despite the Rhodesian Constitution of 1965 coming into effect as a result of the Unilateral Declaration of Independence, appeals continued to be accepted by the Privy Council as late as 1969 due to the fact that under international law, Rhodesia remained a British colony until gaining its independence as Zimbabwe in April 1980.

=== Singapore ===
Singapore abolished Privy Council appeals in all cases save those involving the death penalty, or in civil cases where the parties had agreed to such a right of appeal, in 1989. The remaining rights of appeal were abolished in April 1994.

One notable case in Singapore where an appeal against the death sentence was allowed by the Privy Council was a murder case that occurred in Pulau Ubin between 22 and 23 April 1972. In this case, Mohamed Yasin bin Hussein, who was 19 at the time of the murder, was sentenced to death by the High Court for murdering and raping a 58-year-old woman named Poon Sai Imm, while his 25-year-old accomplice Harun bin Ripin went to ransack the elderly woman's house for items to rob (Harun, who also stood trial for murder together with Yasin, was instead sentenced to 12 years' imprisonment and received 12 strokes of the cane for a lesser charge of robbery at night). The Privy Council found that there was no evidence to show that Yasin had intended to cause death or any fatal bodily injury when he caused the fatal rib fractures on Poon while raping the struggling victim. As such, they found him guilty of committing a rash/negligent act not amounting to culpable homicide and sentenced him to two years' imprisonment. Following this appeal, Yasin was brought back to court to be charged with rape, and he was eventually jailed for another eight years for the attempted rape of the victim.

Another notable case heard by the Privy Council was the case of Haw Tua Tau, a hawker who was sentenced to death in 1978 for the double murder of two hawkers, Phoon Ah Leong and his mother Hu Yuen Keng. After his appeal was dismissed, Haw was granted special leave to appeal to the Privy Council against his sentence and conviction, but his appeal was dismissed by the Privy Council, which issued a landmark ruling that decreed the prosecution shall be allowed to present its case against an accused in court, as long as there is sufficient evidence to back a charge against the accused and hence present a case for the accused to answer. After losing his final appeal, Haw was eventually hanged in 1982 for the hawker killings.

=== South Africa ===
South Africa abolished the right of appeal to the Privy Council from the Appellate Division of the then Supreme Court of South Africa in 1950 under the terms of the Privy Council Appeals Act, 1950.

== See also ==
- Constitutional Reform Act 2005
- List of Judicial Committee of the Privy Council cases
