= 2009 Vincentian constitutional referendum =

| 25 November 2009 |
- Do you approve the Saint Vincent and the Grenadines Constitution 2009 passed in the House of Assembly on the 3rd of September 2009 to provide the new Constitution for St.Vincent and the Grenadines?

Results
| Choice | Votes | % |
|---|---|---|
| Yes | 22,646 | 43.71% |
| No | 29,167 | 56.29% |
| Valid votes | 51,813 | 99.14% |
| Invalid or blank votes | 449 | 0.86% |
| Total votes | 52,262 | 100.00% |
| Registered voters/turnout | 97,724 | 53.48% |
- Results by parish (left) and House of Assembly constituency (right).

A constitutional referendum was held in Saint Vincent and the Grenadines on 25 November 2009. Voters were asked whether they approved of a new constitution which would have replaced the constitution in force since independence in 1979. The proposal was supported by only 43.13% of voters in the referendum, well short of the required two-thirds threshold. If approved, the proposed constitution would have abolished the monarchy of Saint Vincent and the Grenadines, at the time headed by Queen Elizabeth II, and would have given more power to the opposition. The referendum was the first of its kind to be held by a member of the Organisation of Eastern Caribbean States.

== Campaign ==
Prime Minister Ralph Gonsalves and his Unity Labour Party (ULP) campaigned heavily for the "Yes" vote, Gonsalves advocating that, though he had nothing personally against Queen Elizabeth II, he believed it was time for Saint Vincent to stop having a monarch as its head of state; he offered the opinion: "I find it a bit of a Nancy story that the Queen of England can really be the Queen of Saint Vincent and the Grenadines." Though he had earlier shown affinity towards Hugo Chávez and Fidel Castro, Gonsalves asserted that the proposed constitution for Saint Vincent and the Grenadines would not have created such a presidential post; the Prime Minister argued that an executive presidency would give the office holder too much power in the small country. In an interview with the Trinidad and Tobago Express, he stated that type of presidency "may well make perfect sense" for the neighbouring country of Trinidad and Tobago, but such a government would not work in Saint Vincent and the Grenadines, saying further: "it is our assessment that to conjoin the power of a prime minister with the power of a head of state, head of government, or head of state in our circumstances, that is a matter which will end up making that office holder more powerful than the current situation."

Opposition to the constitutional changes was led by the New Democratic Party (NDP), which held the position that the proposed constitution would neither reduce the power of the prime minister nor strengthen the country's democracy. The NDP's leader, Arnhim Eustace, opined that the Gonsalves government and opposition parties had not come to an agreement on a number of fundamental issues, including the Integrity Commission, the Human Rights Commission, the Ombudsman, and the Electoral and Boundaries Commission.

The CARICOM Secretariat announced that it would, at the request of the government of Saint Vincent and the Grenadines, officially observe the referendum, with the support of the Spanish Agency for International Cooperation for Development (AECID), an agency of the government of Spain.

== Conduct ==
Voting took place in heavy rain, with 52,262 of the 97,724 eligible Vincentiens casting ballots at 225 polling stations. The Supervisor of Elections opined that this was a good turn-out given the inclement weather.

== Results ==
| Choice | Votes | % |
|---|---|---|
| For | 22,646 | 43.71 |
| Against | 29,167 | 56.29 |
| Total | 51,813 | 100.00 |
| Valid votes | 51,813 | 99.14 |
| Invalid/blank votes | 449 | 0.86 |
| Total votes | 52,262 | 100.00 |
| Registered voters/turnout | 97,724 | 53.48 |
Source: SVG Government

== See also ==
- 1999 Australian republic referendum
- 2008 Tuvaluan constitutional referendum
