= 2008 Tuvaluan constitutional referendum =

Referendum seeking to abolish the monarchy

- 30 April 2008

Results
| Choice | Votes | % |
|---|---|---|
| Republic | 679 | 35.02% |
| Constitutional monarchy | 1,260 | 64.98% |
| Valid votes | 1,939 | 100.00% |
| Invalid or blank votes | 0 | 0.00% |
| Total votes | 1,939 | 100.00% |
| Registered voters/turnout | 9,000 | 21.54% |

A constitutional referendum was held in Tuvalu on 30 April 2008. The referendum sought to abolish the monarchy of Tuvalu and establish the country as a republic. Had the referendum passed, the new president would have been indirectly elected by the Parliament of Tuvalu.

The referendum failed, with 679 votes in favour of establishing a republic and 1,260 votes to retain the monarchy. As a consequence, Tuvalu remained a monarchy, and Elizabeth II remained head of state. Turnout for the referendum was low. Only 1,939 voters cast valid ballots, out of the approximately 9,000 voting-aged Tuvaluans. In comparison, 8,501 votes were cast in the 2006 parliamentary election.

== Results ==
| Choice | Votes | % |
|---|---|---|
| Monarchy | 1,260 | 64.98 |
| Republic | 679 | 35.02 |
| Invalid/blank votes | | - |
| Total | 1,939 | 100 |
| Registered voters/turnout | c. 9,000 | c. 21.5 |
Source: Radio Australia

== See also ==
- 1999 Australian republic referendum
- 2009 Vincentian constitutional referendum
