= Caribbean Community =

Regional intergovernmental organisation

- - Dutch: Caribische Gemeenschap
  - French: Communauté caribéenne
  - Spanish: Comunidad del Caribe
- Flag Official Logo
- Anthem: "Celebrating CARICOM"
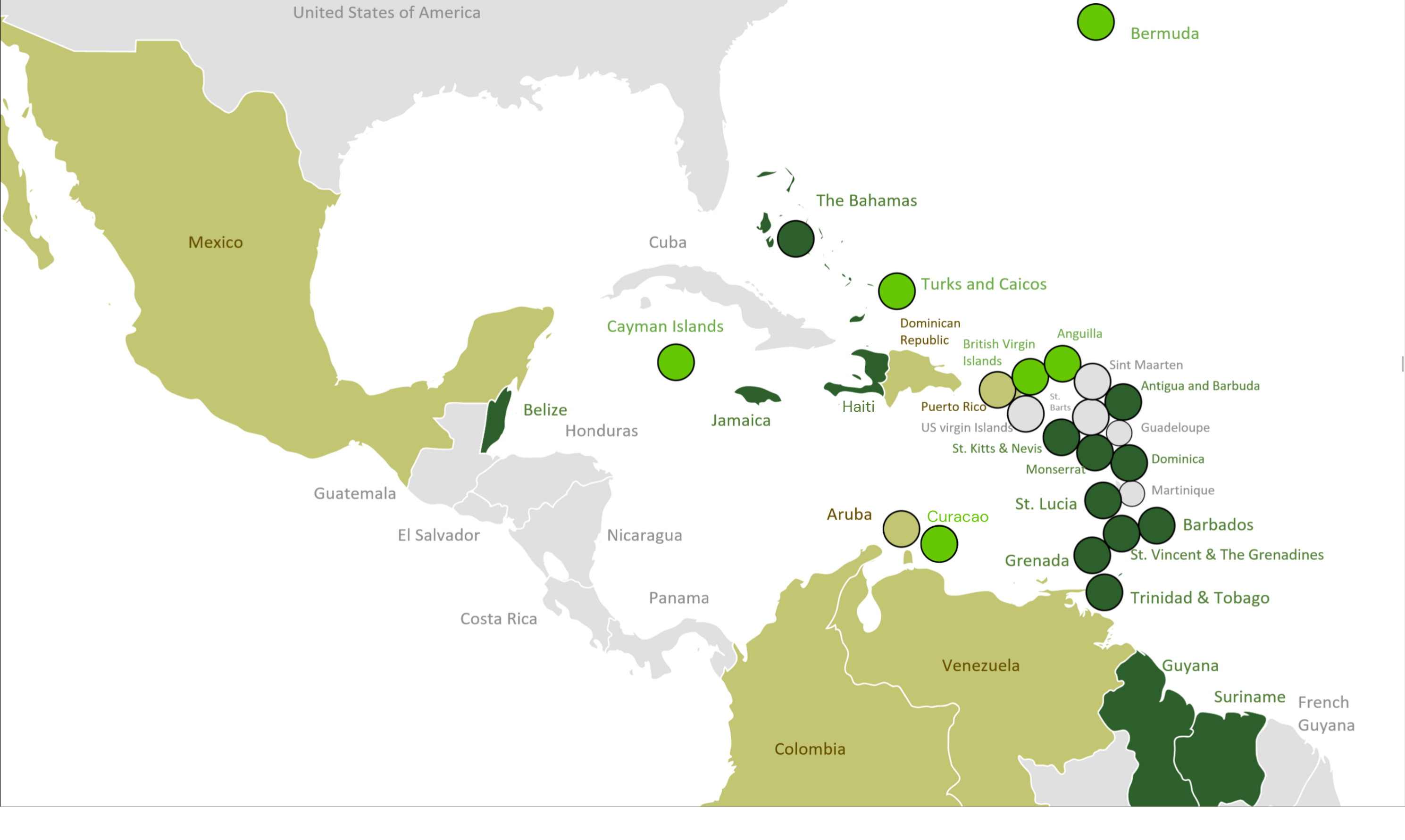
- Full members Associate members Observers
- Seat of Secretariat: Georgetown, Guyana
- Largest city: Port-au-Prince, Haiti
- Official languages: English
- Working language: Dutch; English; French; Spanish
- Other languages: 35 languages: Anguillian English Creole; Antillean French Creole; Arabic; Bajan English; Bajan English Creole; Bahamian English Creole; Belizean English Creole; Belizean Spanish; Caribbean Hindustani; Caribbean Spanish; Cayman Islands English; Chinese; Dominican French Creole; Grenadian English Creole; Grenadian French Creole; Guyanese English Creole; Jamaican English; Jamaican Patois; Martinican Creole; Montserrat English Creole; Ndyuka; Papiamento; Plautdietsch German; Saint Kitts Creole; Saint Lucian French Creole; Saramaccan; Sranan Tongo; Surinamese Dutch; Tobagonian English Creole; Trinidadian English Creole; Trinidadian and Tobagonian English; Trinidadian French-Creole; Turks and Caicos English Creole; Venezuelan Spanish; Venezuelan French Creole; Vincentian English Creole; Virgin Islands English Creole; 16 Indigenous languages: Lokono; Carib (Kari'nja); Garifuna (Karif); Kapóng; Macushi; Mawayana (Mapidian); Mopan; Pemon (Arekuna); Qʼeqchiʼ (Kʼekchi); Sikiana (Kashuyana); Tiriyó; Yucatec; Waiwai; Wapishana; Warao (Guarauno); Wayana
- Ethnic groups: In full member states: 73.78% Afro-Caribbean; 8.30% Multiracial; 6.09% Indian; 0.49% European; 0.39% Indigenous; 0.12% Chinese; 10.83% others
- Religion (2025 est.): In full member states: 85.45% Christianity; 5.70% Hinduism; 2.47% Irreligion; 2.33% Islam; 2.25% African diaspora religions; 1.80% others
- Demonym: Caribbean people
- Type: Supranational union
- Member states: 15 full members: Antigua and Barbuda; Bahamas; Barbados; Belize; Dominica; Grenada; Guyana; Haiti; Jamaica; Montserrat; Saint Kitts and Nevis; Saint Lucia; Saint Vincent and the Grenadines; Suriname; Trinidad and Tobago; 8 associates: Anguilla; Bermuda; British Virgin Islands; Cayman Islands; Curaçao; French Guiana; Turks and Caicos Islands; Martinique; 7 observers: Aruba; Colombia; Dominican Republic; Mexico; Puerto Rico; Sint Maarten; Venezuela
- Government: Intergovernmental
  - Secretary-General: Carla Barnett
  - Chairman: Philip J. Pierre

Establishment
  - Treaty of Chaguaramas: 4 July 1973
  - Revised Treaty of Chaguaramas: 2001

Area
  - Total: 458,480 km^{2} (177,020 sq mi)

Population
  - 2019 estimate: ▲18,482,141 (in full member states); 239,251,864 (in all states)
  - Density: 40.3/km^{2} (104.4/sq mi)
- GDP (PPP): 2020 estimate
  - Total: $145.3 billion
  - Per capita: $18,289
- GDP (nominal): 2019 estimate
  - Total: $81.987 billion
  - Per capita: $12,608
- HDI (2023): ▲0.765 high
- Currency: 14 currencies: Bahamian dollar (BSD); Barbadian dollar (BBD); Belize dollar (BZD); Bermudian dollar (BMD); Cayman Islands dollar (KYD); Eastern Caribbean dollar (XCD); Euro (EUR); Guyanese dollar (GYD); Haitian gourde (HTG); Jamaican dollar (JMD); Caribbean guilder (XCG); Surinamese dollar (SRD); Trinidad and Tobago dollar (TTD); United States dollar (USD)
- Time zone: UTC-6, UTC-5, UTC-4, UTC-3 (CST, EST, AST, GYT, SRT)
  - Summer (DST): UTC-4 (EDT (Note: Only in The Bahamas and Haiti))
- Website https://caricom.org/

The Caribbean Community (abbreviated as CARICOM or CC) is an intergovernmental organisation that is a political and economic union of 15 member states (14 nation-states and one dependency) and eight associated members throughout the Americas, the Caribbean and Atlantic Ocean. It has the primary objective to promote economic integration and cooperation among its members, ensure that the benefits of integration are equitably shared, and coordinate foreign policy. The organisation was established in 1973, by its four founding members signing the Treaty of Chaguaramas.

The secretariat headquarters is in Georgetown, Guyana. CARICOM has been granted the official United Nations General Assembly observer status.

== History ==
CARICOM, originally The Caribbean Community and Common Market, was established by the Treaty of Chaguaramas which took effect on 1 August 1973. Founding states were Barbados, Jamaica, Guyana and Trinidad and Tobago.

The Caribbean Community superseded the 1965–1972 Caribbean Free Trade Association organised to provide a continued economic linkage between the English-speaking countries of the Caribbean after the dissolution of the West Indies Federation, which lasted from 3 January 1958 to 31 May 1962.

A revised Treaty of Chaguaramas established The Caribbean Community including the CARICOM Single Market and Economy, security, foreign exchange and was signed by the CARICOM Heads of Government of the Caribbean Community on 5 July 2001 at their Twenty-Second Meeting of the Conference in Nassau, The Bahamas. The revised treaty cleared the way to transform the idea of a common market CARICOM into the Caribbean (CARICOM) Single Market and Economy.

Haiti's membership in CARICOM remained effectively suspended from 29 February 2004 through early June 2006 following the 2004 Haitian coup d'état and the removal of Jean-Bertrand Aristide from the presidency. CARICOM announced that no democratically elected government in CARICOM should have its leader deposed. The fourteen other heads of government sought to have Aristide fly from Africa to Jamaica and share his account of events with them, which infuriated the interim Haitian prime minister, Gérard Latortue, who announced he would take steps to take Haiti out of CARICOM. CARICOM thus voted on suspending the participation of Haitian officials from the councils of CARICOM. Following the presidential election of René Préval, Haitian officials were readmitted and Préval himself gave the opening address at the CARICOM Council of Ministers meeting in July.

Since 2013 the CARICOM-bloc and with the Dominican Republic have been tied to the European Union via an Economic Partnership Agreements signed in 2008 known as CARIFORUM. The treaty grants all members of the European Union and CARIFORUM equal rights in terms of trade and investment. Under Article 234 of the agreement, the European Court of Justice handles dispute resolution between CARIFORUM and European Union states.

On 1 October 2025, four Caricom members—Barbados, Belize, Dominica, and St. Vincent and the Grenadines—implemented full freedom of movement, going beyond the freedom of movement only for skilled workers that other Caricom members have implemented.

== Agenda and goals ==
CARICOM was established by the English-speaking countries of the Caribbean and currently includes all the independent Anglophone island countries plus Belize, Guyana, Montserrat and Suriname, as well as all other British Caribbean territories and Bermuda as associate members. English was its sole working language into the 1990s. The organisation became multilingual with the addition of Dutch and Sranan Tongo-speaking Suriname in 1995 and the French and Haitian Creole-speaking Haiti in 2002. Furthermore, it added Spanish as the fourth official language in 2003. In July 2012, CARICOM announced they considered making French and Dutch official languages. In 2001, the Conference of Heads of Governments signed a revised Treaty of Chaguaramas that cleared the way to transform the idea of a common market CARICOM into the CARICOM Single Market and Economy. Part of the revised treaty establishes and implements the Caribbean Court of Justice. Its primary activities involve:

- Coordinating economic policies and development planning.
- Devising and instituting special projects for the less-developed countries within its jurisdiction.
- Operating as a regional single market for many of its members (Caricom Single Market).
- Handling regional trade disputes.

== Organisational structure ==
The following is the overall structure of Caribbean Community (CARICOM).

=== Administration and staff ===
| Institution | Abbreviation | Location | Country |
|---|---|---|---|
| Secretariat of the Caribbean Community | CCS | Georgetown | Guyana |
| Caricom heads of government | PCC | variable | |
| Conference of Heads of Governments | HGC | variable | |
| Assembly of Caribbean Community Parliamentarians | ACCP | variable | |
| Caribbean Community Administrative Tribunal | CCAT | Port of Spain | Trinidad and Tobago |

=== Chairmanship ===
The post of Chairman (Head of CARICOM) is held in rotation by the regional Heads of Government of CARICOM's 15 member states. These include Antigua and Barbuda, Belize, Dominica, Grenada, Haiti, Montserrat, St. Kitts and Nevis, St. Lucia, St. Vincent and the Grenadines, The Bahamas, Barbados, Guyana, Jamaica, Suriname, Trinidad and Tobago.

=== Heads of government ===
CARICOM contains a quasi-Cabinet of the individual Heads of Government. These heads are given specialised portfolios of responsibility for regional development and integration.

=== Secretariat ===
The Secretariat of the Caribbean Community is the Chief Administrative Organ for CARICOM. The Secretary-General of the Caribbean Community is the chief executive and handles foreign and community relations. Five years is the term of office of the Secretary-General, which may be renewed. The Deputy Secretary-General of the Caribbean Community handles human and Social Development. The General Counsel of the Caribbean Community handles trade and economic integration.

The goal statement of the CARICOM Secretariat is: "To contribute, in support of Member States, to the improvement of the quality of life of the People of the Community and the development of an innovative and productive society in partnership with institutions and groups working towards attaining a people-centred, sustainable and internationally competitive Community."

=== Organs and bodies ===
Principal organs
| Organ | Description |
|---|---|
| CARICOM Heads of Government | Consisting of the various heads of Government from each member state |
| Standing Committee of Ministers | Ministerial responsibilities for specific areas, for example the Standing Committee of Ministers responsible for Health will consist of Ministers of Health from each member state |

==== Community Council ====
The Community Council comprises ministers responsible for community affairs and any other Minister designated by the member states at their discretion. It is one of the community's principal organs; the other is the Conference of the Heads of Government. Five other organs and four bodies support it.

Secondary organs
| Secondary organ | Abbreviation |
|---|---|
| Council for Finance and Planning | COFAP |
| Council for Foreign and Community Relations | COFCOR |
| Council for Human and Social Development | COHSOD |
| Council for National Security and Law Enforcement | CONSLE |
| Council for Trade and Economic Development | COTED |

Bodies
| Body | Description |
|---|---|
| Legal Affairs Committee | provides legal advice |
| Budget Committee | examines the draft budget and work programme of the Secretariat and submits recommendations to the Community Council. |
| Committee of the Central Bank Governors | provides recommendations to the COFAP on monetary and financial matters. |
| Committee of Ambassadors | facilitates implementation of the Community's Strategic Plan and reports to the Community Council. |

== Institutions ==
The following institutions are founded by or affiliated to the Caricom:

=== Caricom Institutions ===
| Institution | Abbreviation | Location | Country |
|---|---|---|---|
| Caribbean Centre for Renewable Energy and Energy Efficiency | CCREEE | Bridgetown | Barbados |
| Caricom Development Fund | CDF | Bridgetown | Barbados |
| Caribbean Telecommunications Union | CTU | Port of Spain | Trinidad and Tobago |
| Caribbean Community Climate Change Centre | CCCCC | Belmopan | Belize |
| Caricom Regional Organisation for Standards and Quality | CROSQ | Bridgetown | Barbados |
| Caribbean Meteorological Organisation | CMO | Port of Spain | Trinidad and Tobago |
| Caribbean Regional Fisheries Mechanism | CRFM | Belize City | Belize |
| Caricom Implementation Agency for Crime and Security | IMPACS | Port of Spain | Trinidad and Tobago |
| Caribbean Institute for Meteorology and Hydrology | CIMH | Bridgetown | Barbados |
| Caribbean Examinations Council | CXC | Bridgetown | Barbados |
| Caribbean Court of Justice | CCtJ/CCJ | Port of Spain | Trinidad and Tobago |
| Caricom Competition Commission | CCC | Paramaribo | Suriname |
| Caribbean Disaster Emergency Management Agency | CDEMA | Saint Michael | Barbados |
| Caribbean Agricultural Health and Food Safety Agency | CAHFSA | Paramaribo | Suriname |
| Caribbean Aviation Safety and Security Oversight System | CASSOS | Kingston | Jamaica |
| Caribbean Public Health Agency | CARPHA | Port of Spain | Trinidad and Tobago |
| Caribbean Centre for Development Administration | CARICAD | Saint Michael | Barbados |
| Caribbean Agriculture Research and Development Institute | CARDI | Saint Augustine | Trinidad and Tobago |
| Caribbean Organisation of Tax Administrators | COTA | Georgetown | Guyana |

=== Functional cooperation ===
| Institution | Abbreviation | Location | Country |
|---|---|---|---|
| Caribbean Tourism Organization | CTO | Saint Michael | Barbados |
| Caribbean Council of Legal Education | CLE | several | |
| Caribbean Export Development Agency | Caribbean Export | Saint Michael | Barbados |
| Caribbean Regional Information and Translation Institute | CRITI | Paramaribo | Suriname |

=== Associate ===
| Institution | Abbreviation | Location | Country |
|---|---|---|---|
| Caribbean Congress of Labour | CCL | Saint Michael | Barbados |
| Caricom Private Sector Organization | CPSO | Saint Michael | Barbados |
| University of the West Indies | UWI | several | |
| University of Guyana | UG | Georgetown | Guyana |
| Caribbean Law Institute | CLI | Saint Michael | Barbados |
| Caribbean Development Bank | CDB | Saint Michael | Barbados |

=== Cancelled ===
The following institutions have been cancelled or merged into other ones:

| Institution | Abbreviation | Location | Country |
|---|---|---|---|
| Regional Educational Programme for Animal Health Assistants | REPAHA | New Amsterdam | Guyana |
| Caribbean Food Corporation | CFC | Saint Augustine | Trinidad and Tobago |
| Caribbean Environmental Health Institute | CEHI | Castries | Saint Lucia |
| The Caribbean Epidemiology Centre | CAREC | Port of Spain | Trinidad and Tobago |
| Caribbean Food and Nutrition Institute | CFNI | Kingston | Jamaica |
| Caribbean Health Research Council | CHRC | Saint Augustine | Trinidad and Tobago |
| Caribbean Regional Drug Testing Laboratory | CRDTL | Georgetown | Guyana |

== Relationship to other organisations ==
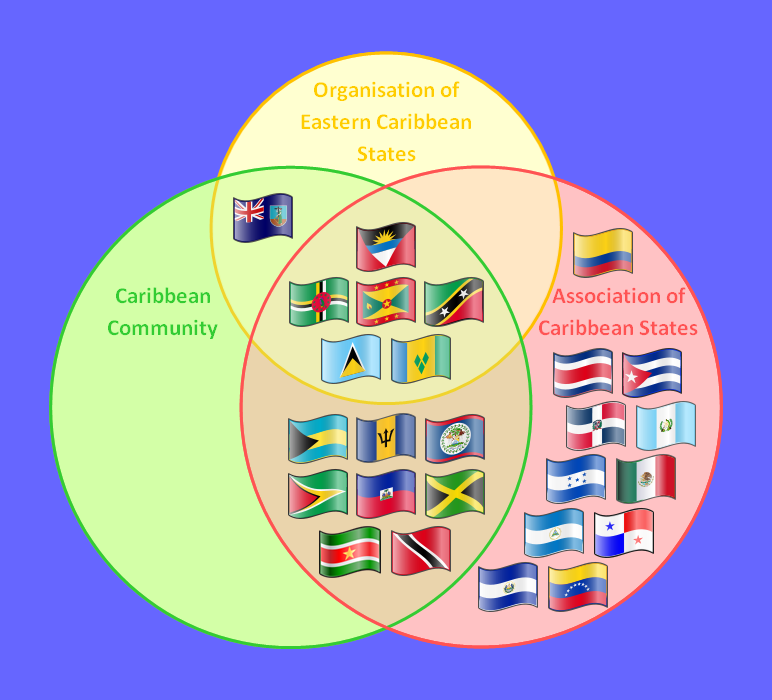
A clickable Venn diagram showing the relationships between various Supranational Caribbean Organisations and agreements

A clickable Euler diagram showing the relationships between various multinational organizations in the Americas

=== African Union ===
Some editorial and political discourse has been made about the African diaspora and specifically the potential level of engagement which could be garnered between the African continent and the Caribbean region. Many Caribbean nations have sought to deepen ties with nations in the continent of Africa. Leading to the African Union-bloc referring to the Caribbean as the potential "Sixth Region" of the African Union under the protocol on the amendment to the Constitutive Act of 2003. Some Caribbean states have already moved to join Africa institutions including Barbados, Grenada, Guyana, and The Bahamas which have all become members of the African Export-Import Bank. And the Caribbean Development Bank has signed a cooperation strategic partnership agreement with the African Development Bank (AfDB). In 2022 the former President of Jamaica even made calls for Caribbean States to seek partnership with the AfCFTA agreement. At present Antigua and Barbuda, Barbados, Jamaica, Guyana, and Suriname are at various stages of establishing direct air flights with Africa to boost person-to-person links and boost trade, or tourism between both regions. Several Caribbean islands have also looked to open negotiations on easing passport visa restrictions between both regions.

The first inter-regional Africa-Caribbean Community (CARICOM) Summit took place in September 2021. In August 2023 the African Union's African Export–Import Bank officially launched its first Caribbean Community office in Barbados beginning the process of integrating willing Caribbean states as the 6th region of the African Union. The Government of Barbados donated the land in order to help complete the deal. In 2023 the CARICOM-bloc's central banks voted to choose the African PAPSS-system as the preferred method for clearing inter-regional transactions.

In August 2026, the President of Ghana, John Dramani Mahama, stated that one of his agenda items when he leads the African Union next year will be the inclusion of the Caribbean Community into the AfCFTA framework. To facilitate the move, a parliament-supported joint commission is to be assembled between both regions with the aim of legal and national standards harmonisation. The initiative may delve into the idea of also separating the Caribbean out of the 6th region known as "diaspora", and forming it as a special 7th region directly of the AU. Under the agreement it's been proposed that leaders of nations which have signed on to the arrangement will be allowed to sit-in and take part in African Union meetings as well.

=== Association of Caribbean States ===
CARICOM was instrumental in the formation of the Association of Caribbean States (ACS) on 24 July 1994. The original idea for the Association came from a recommendation of the West Indian Commission, established in 1989 by the CARICOM heads of state and government. The Commission advocated both deepening the integration process (through the CARICOM Single Market and Economy) and complementing it through a separate regional organisation encompassing all states in the Caribbean.

CARICOM accepted the commission's recommendations and opened dialogue with other Caribbean states, the Central American states and the Latin American nations of Colombia, Venezuela and Mexico which border the Caribbean, for consultation on the proposals of the West Indian Commission.

At an October 1993 summit, the heads of state and government of CARICOM and the presidents of the then-Group of Three (Colombia, Mexico and Venezuela) formally decided to create an association grouping all states of the Caribbean basin. A work schedule for its formation was adopted. The aim was to create the association in less than a year, an objective which was achieved with the formal creation of the ACS.

=== Community of Latin American and Caribbean States ===
CARICOM was also involved in the formation of the Community of Latin American and Caribbean States (CELAC) on 3 December 2010. The idea for CELAC originated at the Rio Group–Caribbean Community Unity Summit on 23 February 2010 in Mexico. This act caters to the integration of the Americas process, complimenting well-established initiatives of the Organization of American States.

=== European Union: Economic Partnership Agreements ===
Since 2013, the CARICOM-bloc and the Dominican Republic have been tied to the European Union via an Economic Partnership Agreements known as CARIFORUM signed in 2008. The treaty grants all members of the European Union and CARIFORUM equal rights in terms of trade and investment. Within the agreement under Article 234, the European Court of Justice also carries dispute resolution mechanisms between CARIFORUM and the states of the European Union.

=== OHADAC Project ===
In May 2016, Caricom's court of original jurisdiction, the CCJ, signed a memorandum of understanding (MOU) with the ACP Legal Association based in Guadeloupe recognising and supporting the goals of implementing a harmonised business law framework in the Caribbean through ACP Legal Association's OHADAC Project.

OHADAC is the acronym for the French "Organisation pour l'Harmonisation du Droit des Affaires en les Caraïbes", which translates into English as "Organisation for the Harmonisation of Business Law in the Caribbean". The OHADAC Project takes inspiration from a similar organisation in Africa and aims to enhance economic integration across the entire Caribbean and facilitate increased trade and international investment through unified laws and alternative dispute resolution methods.

== Member states ==
As of 2026 CARICOM has 15 full members, eight associate members and eight observers. The associated members are five British Overseas Territories, one constituent county of the Kingdom of the Netherlands and two French overseas regions. It is currently not established what the role of the associate members will be. The observers are states which engage in at least one of CARICOM's technical committees.

Under Article 4 CARICOM breaks its 15 member states into two groups: Less Developed Countries (LDCs) and More Developed Countries (MDCs).

The countries of CARICOM which are designated as Less Developed Countries (LDCs) are as follows:

- Antigua and Barbuda
- Belize
- Commonwealth of Dominica
- Grenada
- Republic of Haiti
- Montserrat
- Federation of St. Kitts and Nevis
- St Lucia
- St Vincent and the Grenadines

The countries of CARICOM which are designated as More Developed Countries (MDCs) are:

- Commonwealth of The Bahamas
- Barbados
- Co-operative Republic of Guyana
- Jamaica
- Republic of Suriname
- Republic of Trinidad and Tobago

CARICOM members
| Status | Name | Join date | Notes |
|---|---|---|---|
| Full member | Antigua and Barbuda | 4 July 1974 | |
| Full member | The Bahamas | 4 July 1983 | Not a part of the customs union |
| Full member | Barbados | 1 August 1973 | One of the four founding members |
| Full member | Belize | 1 May 1974 | |
| Full member | Dominica | 1 May 1974 | |
| Full member | Grenada | 1 May 1974 | |
| Full member | Guyana | 1 August 1973 | One of the four founding members |
| Full member | Haiti | 2 July 2002 | Provisional membership on 4 July 1998 |
| Full member | Jamaica | 1 August 1973 | One of the four founding members |
| Full member | Montserrat | 1 May 1974 | British overseas territory |
| Full member | Saint Kitts and Nevis | 26 July 1974 | Joined as Saint Christopher-Nevis-Anguilla |
| Full member | Saint Lucia | 1 May 1974 | |
| Full member | Saint Vincent and the Grenadines | 1 May 1974 | |
| Full member | Suriname | 4 July 1995 | |
| Full member | Trinidad and Tobago | 1 August 1973 | One of the four founding members |
| Associate | Anguilla | 4 July 1999 | British overseas territory |
| Associate | Bermuda | 2 July 2003 | British overseas territory |
| Associate | British Virgin Islands | 2 July 1991 | British overseas territory |
| Associate | Cayman Islands | 16 May 2002 | British overseas territory |
| Associate | Curaçao | 28 July 2024 | Constituent country of the Kingdom of the Netherlands |
| Associate | French Guiana | 7 July 2026 | French overseas region |
| Associate | Martinique | 16 June 2026 | French overseas region |
| Associate | Turks and Caicos Islands | 2 July 1991 | British overseas territory |
| Observer | Aruba | | Constituent country of the Kingdom of the Netherlands |
| Observer | Colombia | | |
| Observer | Dominican Republic | | |
| Observer | Mexico | | |
| Observer | Puerto Rico | | Unincorporated territory of the United States |
| Observer | Sint Maarten | | Constituent country of the Kingdom of the Netherlands |
| Observer | Venezuela | | |

Thousands of Caricom nationals live within other member states of the Community.

An estimated 30,000 Jamaicans legally reside in other CARICOM member states, mainly in The Bahamas (6,200), Antigua & Barbuda (estimated 12,000), Barbados and Trinidad & Tobago). Also, an estimated 150 Jamaicans live and work in Montserrat. A 21 November 2013 estimated put 16,958 Jamaicans residing illegally in Trinidad & Tobago, as according to the records of the Office of the Chief Immigration Officer, their entry certificates would have since expired. By October 2014, the estimated Jamaicans residing illegally in Trinidad and Tobago was 19,000 along with an estimated 7,169 Barbadians and 25,884 Guyanese residing illegally. An estimated 8,000 Trinidadians and Tobagonians live in Jamaica.

Exclusive Economic Zones of the member states of the CARICOM. Considering them, the total area reaches the 2 300 297 km^{2}.

Barbados hosts a large diaspora population of Guyanese, of whom (in 2005) 5,032 lived there permanently as citizens, permanent residents, immigrants (with immigrant status) and Caricom skilled nationals; 3,200 were residing in Barbados temporarily under work permits, as students, or with "reside and work" status. A further 2,000–3,000 Guyanese were estimated to be living illegally in Barbados at the time. Migration between Barbados and Guyana has deep roots, going back over 150 years, with the most intense period of Barbadian migration to then-British Guiana occurring between 1863 and 1886, although as late as the 1920s and 1930s Barbadians were still leaving Barbados for British Guiana.

Migration between Guyana and Suriname also goes back a number of years. An estimated 50,000 Guyanese had migrated to Suriname by 1986 In 1987 an estimated 30–40,000 Guyanese were in Suriname. Many Guyanese left Suriname in the 1970s and 1980s, either voluntarily or by expulsion. Citing a national security concern, over 5,000 were expelled in January 1985 alone. In the instability Suriname experienced following independence, both coups and civil war. In 2013, an estimated 11,530 Guyanese had emigrated to Suriname and 4,662 Surinamese to Guyana.

=== Relationship with Cuba ===
In 2017, the Republic of Cuba and CARICOM signed the "CARICOM-Cuba Trade and Economic Cooperation Agreement" to facilitate closer trade ties. In December 2022, First Secretary of the Communist Party of Cuba Miguel Díaz-Canel met in Bridgetown, Barbados with the heads of state and government of the CARICOM. On the occasion of the 8th CARICOM-Cuba Summit to commemorate the 50th Anniversary of establishing diplomatic relations with the independent States of CARICOM and Cuba and the 20th Anniversary of CARICOM-Cuba Day. Cuba also accepted CARICOM's offer to deepen bilateral cooperation and to join robust discussions in the bloc's regional 'Joint Ministerial Taskforce on Food production and Security'.

== Dialogue partners / accreditation to CARICOM ==
A number of global partners have established diplomatic representation to the Caribbean Community (CARICOM) Secretariat located in Georgetown, Guyana. Nations with non-resident representatives to CARICOM in italics:

1. African Union ^{Non accreditation, but as dialogue partner}
2. Argentina
3. Australia
4. Austria
5. Belgium
6. Botswana
7. Brazil
8. Canada
9. Chile
10. Colombia
11. Costa Rica
12. Cuba
13. El Salvador
14. European Union
15. Finland
16. France
17. Germany
18. Greece
19. India
20. Indonesia
21. Ireland
22. Israel
23. Italy
24. Japan
25. Latvia
26. Lithuania
27. Mexico
28. Netherlands
29. New Zealand
30. Palestine
31. Panama
32. Peru
33. Portugal
34. Romania
35. Singapore
36. Slovenia
37. South Korea
38. Sweden
39. Switzerland
40. Turkey
41. United Kingdom
42. United States of America
43. Venezuela

== Free-trade agreements ==
- List of bilateral free-trade agreements#CARICOM

== Statistics ==
Population and economic statistics of full and associate members
| Member | Membership | Land area (km^{2}) | Population (2019) | GDP (PPP) Millions USD (2017) | GDP Per Capita (PPP) USD (2017) | Human Development Index (2023) |
|---|---|---|---|---|---|---|
| Anguilla | associate | 91 | 15,174 | 175.4 | 12,200 | – |
| Antigua and Barbuda | full member | 442.6 | 104,084 | 2,390 | 26,300 | 0.851 |
| The Bahamas | full member | 10,010 | 385,340 | 9,339 | 25,100 | 0.820 |
| Barbados | full member | 430 | 287,010 | 4,919 | 17,500 | 0.811 |
| Belize | full member | 22,806 | 398,050 | 3,230 | 8,300 | 0.721 |
| Bermuda | associate | 54 | 63,779 | 5,198 | 85,700 | – |
| British Virgin Islands | associate | 151 | 32,206 | 500 | 42,300 | – |
| Cayman Islands | associate | 264 | 64,420 | 2,507 | 43,800 | – |
| Dominica | full member | 751 | 74,679 | 851 | 12,000 | 0.761 |
| Grenada | full member | 344 | 108,825 | 1,590 | 14,700 | 0.791 |
| Guyana | full member | 214,970 | 786,508 | 6,367 | 8,300 | 0.776 |
| Haiti | full member | 27,560 | 11,242,856 | 19,880 | 1,800 | 0.554 |
| Jamaica | full member | 10,831 | 2,728,864 | 26,200 | 9,200 | 0.720 |
| Montserrat | full member | 102 | 5,220 | 43.8 | 8,500 | – |
| Saint Kitts and Nevis | full member | 261 | 56,345 | 1,528 | 26,800 | 0.840 |
| Saint Lucia | full member | 606 | 180,454 | 2,384 | 13,500 | 0.748 |
| Saint Vincent and the Grenadines | full member | 389 | 109,803 | 1,281 | 11,600 | 0.798 |
| Suriname | full member | 156,000 | 573,085 | 7,928 | 13,900 | 0.722 |
| Trinidad and Tobago | full member | 5,128 | 1,359,193 | 42,780 | 31,200 | 0.807 |
| Turks and Caicos Islands | associate | 948 | 37,910 | 632 | 29,100 | – |
| Full members | members only | 432,510 | 18,400,316 | 130,711 | 15,247 | 0.751 |

== Symbols ==
=== Flag ===
The flag of the Caribbean Community was chosen and approved in November 1983 at the Conference of Heads of Government Meeting in Port of Spain, Trinidad. The original design by the firm of WINART Studies in Georgetown, Guyana was substantially modified at the July 1983 Meeting of the Conference of Heads of Government. The flag was first flown on 4 July 1984 in Nassau, The Bahamas at the fifth Meeting of the Conference of Heads of Government.

The flag features a blue background, but the upper part is a light blue representing sky and the lower, a darker blue representing the Caribbean Sea. The yellow circle in the centre represents the sun on which is printed in black the logo of the Caribbean Community, two interlocking Cs. The two Cs are in the form of broken links in a chain, symbolising both unity and a break with the colonial past. The narrow ring of green around the sun represents the vegetation of the region.

=== Song ===
For CARICOM's 40th anniversary, a competition to compose an official song or anthem for CARICOM was launched in April 2013 to promote choosing a song that promoted unity and inspired CARICOM identity and pride. A regional panel of judges comprising independent experts in music was nominated by member states and the CARICOM Secretariat. Three rounds of competition condensed 63 entries to a final three, from which judges chose Celebrating CARICOM by Michele Henderson of Dominica in March 2014. Henderson won a US$10,000 prize. Her song was produced by her husband, Roland Delsol Jr., and arranged by Earlson Matthew. It also featured Michael Ferrol on drums and choral input from the St. Alphonsus Choir. It was re-produced for CARICOM by Carl Beaver Henderson of Trinidad and Tobago.

A second-place entry titled My CARICOM came from Jamaican Adiel Thomas who won US$5,000, and a third-place song titled One CARICOM by Carmella Lawrence of St. Kitts and Nevis, won US$2,500. The other songs from the top-ten finalists (in no particular order) were:

- One Region one Caribbean from Anguilla,
- One Caribbean Family from Jamaica,
- CARICOM’s Light from St. Vincent & the Grenadines,
- We Are CARICOM from Dominica,
- Together As one from Dominica,
- Blessed CARICOM from Jamaica,
- Together We Rise from Jamaica.

The first official performance of Celebrating Caricom by Henderson took place on Tuesday 1 July 2014 at the opening ceremony for the Thirty-Fifth Regional Meeting of the Conference of Heads of Government in Antigua and Barbuda.

=== Celebration ===
==== CARICOM Day ====
The celebration of CARICOM Day is the selected day some Caribbean Community (CARICOM) countries officially recognise the commemorative date of signing of the Treaty of Chaguaramas, the agreement that established CARICOM on 4 July 1973. The Treaty was signed in Chaguaramas, Trinidad & Tobago by then leaders of: Barbados, Guyana, Jamaica, and Trinidad and Tobago. CARICOM Day is recognised as an official public holiday in Guyana where the secretariat is based, and is observed on the first Monday of July. The government of Antigua and Barbuda has also implemented CARICOM Day as a holiday.

The day features activities that are organised by government entities such as parades, pageants, and campaigns to educate people about CARICOM.

=== Caribbean Festival of Arts – CARIFESTA ===
Caribbean Festival of Arts, commonly known as CARIFESTA, is an annual festival for promoting arts of the Caribbean with a different country hosting the event each year. It was started to provide a venue to "depict the life of the people of the Region, their heroes, morals, myths, traditions, beliefs, creativity and ways of expression" by fostering a sense of Caribbean unity, and motivating artists by showing the best of their home country. It began under the auspices of Guyana's then President Forbes Burnham in 1972, who was inspired by other singular arts festivals in the region.

== See also ==
- List of diplomatic missions in Guyana
- Association of Caribbean States
- EU/UK–CARIFORUM
- CARIFORUM–United Kingdom Economic Partnership Agreement
- CSME
- Caribbean Financial Action Task Force
- Caribbean Initiative
- Caribbean Agricultural Research and Development Institute (CARDI)
- Caribbean Accreditation Authority for Education in Medicine and other Health Professions
- Caribbean Knowledge and Learning Network
- Community of Latin American and Caribbean States
- Commonwealth of Nations
- Languages of the Caribbean
- List of regional organizations by population
- North American Free Trade Agreement (NAFTA)
- North American Union (NAU)
- Organisation of African, Caribbean and Pacific States
- Organization of American States
- Petrocaribe
- Projects of the Caribbean Community
- Small Island Developing States
- Union of South American Nations (UNASUR)
- West Indies
