= CKLN =

CKLN may refer to:

- CKLN-FM, a defunct radio station in Toronto, Ontario, Canada which broadcast on 88.1 FM from 1983 until 2011.
- CKLN-FM 97.1, a rebroadcaster of CHVO-FM in Clarenville, Newfoundland and Labrador since 2016
- CKLN, an AM radio station in Nelson, British Columbia which became CKKC in 1967;
- Caribbean Knowledge and Learning Network, a CARICOM agency responsible for the region's fibre optic network.
