= Caribbean Agricultural Research and Development Institute =

Agricultural development organization serving the Caribbean region

The Caribbean Agricultural Research and Development Institute (CARDI) carries out research and development for agriculture in the Caribbean region. Its headquarters are on the campus of the University of the West Indies (UWI), at St. Augustine in Trinidad and Tobago and it also has national offices throughout the region.

== History ==
CARDI's roots are to be found in the Imperial College of Tropical Agriculture (ICTA), a post-graduate training institution for the British empire located in St Augustine, Trinidad. In 1955, a Regional Research Centre (RRC) was established as part of ICTA. With withdrawal of British funding foreseen in the late-1960s, RRC's staff was transferred to the Faculty of Agriculture of UWI.

The RRC had become particularly known for carrying out soil surveys and for the production of soil maps of Caribbean countries, as well as for research on traditional food crops and on pests, diseases and weed management. Within the context of the Treaty of Chaguaramas, which promoted regional cooperation, the region's Heads of Government appointed a team to examine both RRC and regional agricultural research in general. This concluded that RRC should be replaced by a new regional organization that would be independent of UWI and be responsible to the CARICOM Standing Committee of Ministers of Agriculture. Following acceptance of these recommendations CARDI was established in 1975.

At its inception, 12 CARICOM member countries signed the agreement to establish CARDI: Antigua and Barbuda, Barbados, Belize, Dominica, Grenada, Guyana, Jamaica, Montserrat, St Kitts–Nevis, St Lucia, St Vincent and the Grenadines and Trinidad and Tobago. These provide funds for the Institute's core budget, while funding for projects comes from donor agencies.

== Activities ==
CARDI is charged with a wide range of development activities, in addition to the strengthening of regional collaboration for agricultural research. These include the upgrading of facilities for intra-regional agricultural trade and transport and the evaluation of investment opportunities, as well as the provision of market intelligence. Emphasis is placed on roots and tubers, cereals and pulses, hot peppers, fruits and vegetables and small ruminants.
