= Patuá =

Patuá or Patua is a phonetic rendering of the word "patois" in some speech varieties. It may refer to:

- Karipúna French Creole
- Macanese Patois
- San Miguel Creole
- Venezuelan French Creole
