= CXN =

CXN can refer to:

- China Southwest Airlines, a defunct airline based in China, by ICAO code
- Caribbean Exchange Network, a regional stock exchange based in the Caribbean
- Candala Airport, an airstrip in Qandala, Somalia, by IATA code
