= Caribbean Free Trade Association =

English speaking economic trade organization

- 1965/1968–1974
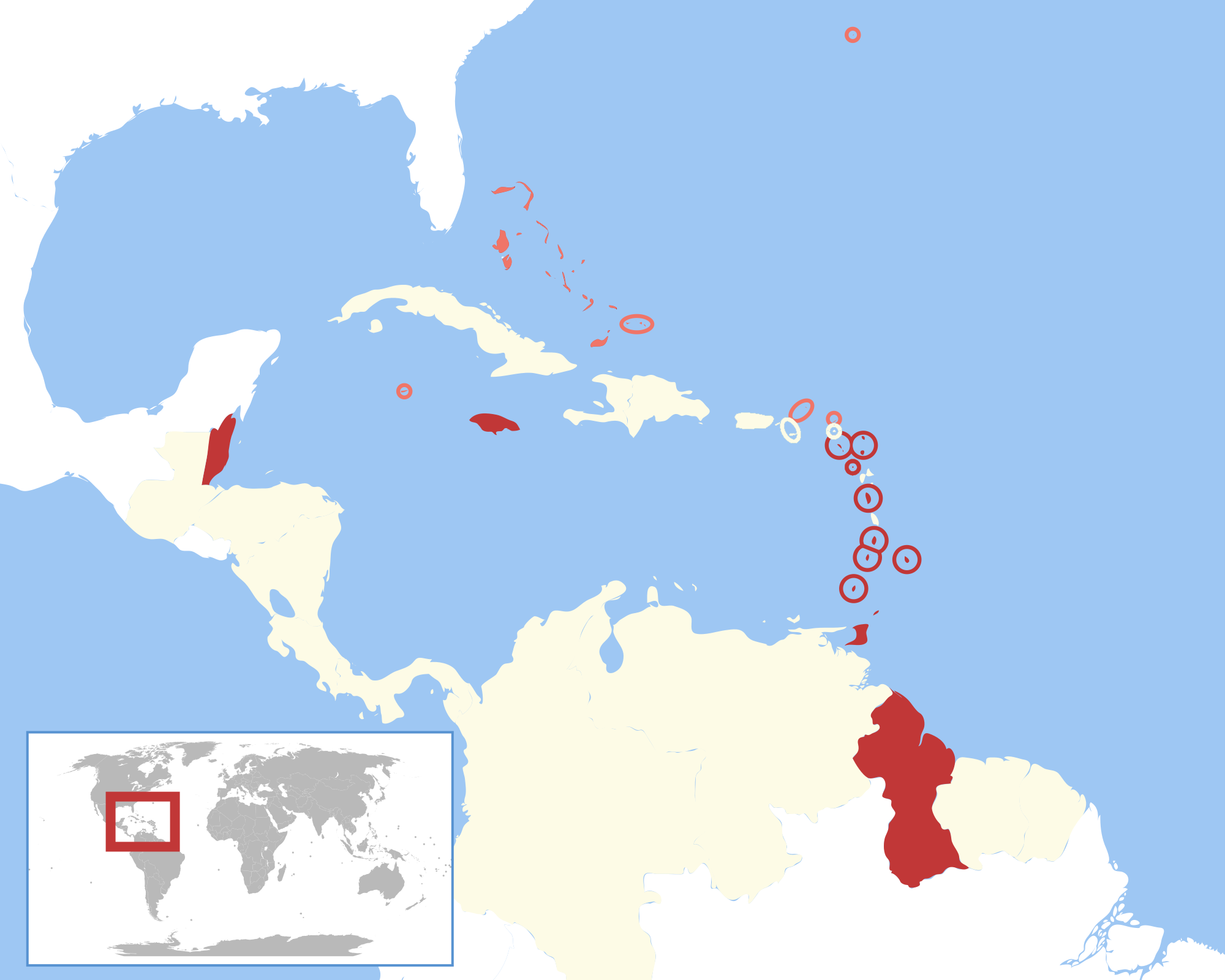
- A map of CARIFTA Member States (red) and other Commonwealth Caribbean territories (pink) that were eligible for simplified accession to CARIFTA. CARIFTA comprised all of the Commonwealth Caribbean except the Bahamas, Turks and Caicos Islands, Cayman Islands, Bermuda, British Virgin Islands and Anguilla (de facto)
- Status: International organisation
- Seat of Secretariat: Georgetown, Guyana
- Largest city: Kingston, Jamaica
- Official working language: English
- Official languages of member states: English
- Type: Regional organization, Free-trade area
- Member states: 12 full members: Antigua and Barbuda; Barbados; British Honduras; Dominica; Grenada; Guyana; Jamaica; Montserrat; Saint Christopher-Nevis-Anguilla; Saint Lucia; Saint Vincent and the Grenadines; Trinidad and Tobago
- Secretary General
  - 1968–1969: Frederick L. Cozier
  - 1969–1974: William Demas

Establishment
- Historical era: Cold War
  - Established: 1 May 1968
  - Disestablished: 1 May 1974

Area
  - Total: 238,939.6 km^{2} (92,255.1 sq mi)

Population
  - 1970 estimate: 4,438,068
  - Density: 18.6/km^{2} (48.2/sq mi)
- GDP (nominal): 1972 estimate
  - Total: $2,705 million
  - Per capita: $609
- Currency: Barbadian dollar (BBD); Belize dollar (BZD); Eastern Caribbean dollar (XCD); Guyanese dollar (GYD); Jamaican dollar (JMD); Trinidad and Tobago dollar (TTD)
| Preceded by | Succeeded by |
| West Indies Federation; East Caribbean Common Market | Caribbean Community |
- Today part of: Caribbean Community

The Caribbean Free Trade Association (CARIFTA) was an English-speaking economic trade organisation. It organised on 1 May 1968, to provide a continued economic linkage between the English-speaking countries of the Caribbean. The agreements establishing it came following the dissolution of the West Indies Federation, which lasted from 1958 to 1962.

== History ==
The origins of CARIFTA lay in a meeting on July 4, 1965, between the Prime Ministers of Barbados and British Guiana (Errol Barrow and Forbes Burnham respectively) to discuss the possibility of establishing a free trade area between the two territories, which at the time were moving towards independence from the United Kingdom. The discussions revolved around establish a free trade area between only those two countries initially and then extending it to the rest of the Caribbean when the other countries in the Commonwealth Caribbean were ready to join.

These bilateral discussions between Barrow and Burnham were later expanded to include V. C. Bird of Antigua and the three leaders ultimately signed the initial CARIFTA Agreement (the Agreement of Dickenson Bay in Antigua) on December 15, 1965. The original date envisioned for the Caribbean Free Trade Area to come into existence, according to the Dickenson Bay Agreement, was May 15, 1967. However, as a result of shuttle diplomacy engaged by Dr. Eric Williams, Prime Minister of Trinidad and Tobago, (through one of his ministers, Kamaluddin Mohammed) this was postponed as in order to allow Trinidad and Tobago to be included in the agreement and to generally make the agreement region-wide from the beginning. Dr. Williams had for years been advocating the establishment of a Caribbean Economic Community and was now fearful that Barbados, Antigua and Guyana were planning to form a free trade area between themselves to the exclusion of Trinidad and Tobago. The push to make the free trade area a region-initiative was successful and the issue was discussed at the fourth Conference of the Heads of Government of Commonwealth Caribbean Countries in Bridgetown, Barbados in October 1967. There it was resolved to introduce the free trade area by May 1, 1968, with the delegations of Montserrat and British Honduras (Belize) entering reservations to the conclusions of the resolution due to the constitutional status of their governments at the time. As a result of this a supplementary agreement to the original Carifta Agreement was signed in Georgetown, Guyana on March 15, 1968, and in St John's, Antigua on March 18, 1968, with Carifta Day set for May 1, 1968.

The new CARIFTA agreement came into effect on May 1, 1968, with the participation of Antigua, Barbados, Trinidad and Tobago and Guyana. The original idea to permit all territories in the region to participate in the Association was achieved a few months later with the entry of Dominica, Grenada, St. Kitts/Nevis/Anguilla, Saint Lucia and St. Vincent in July and of Jamaica and Montserrat on August 1, 1968. British Honduras (Belize) became a member in May 1971 following its government's agreement to become a member of the Association (and had promised to take the necessary steps to become so) in February 1969 at a Commonwealth Caribbean Heads of Government Conference in Port-of-Spain, Trinidad and Tobago.

== Function and Internal Trade ==
The Caribbean Free Trade Association was created to improve relations between the various Caribbean islands. One of the reasons of the formation of the CARIFTA was to increase the quota and variety of goods able to be sold. Specifically, CARIFTA was intended to encourage balanced development of the Region by the following:

- increasing trade - buying and selling more goods among the Member States
- diversifying trade - expanding the variety of goods and services available for trade
- liberalising trade - removing tariffs and quotas on goods produced and traded within the area
- ensuring fair competition - setting up rules for all members to follow to protect the smaller enterprises

In addition to providing for free trade, the Agreement sought the following:

- ensure that the benefits of free trade were equitably distributed
- promote industrial development in the Less Developed Countries (LDCs)
- promote the development of the coconut industry (through an Oils and Fats Agreement) which was significant in many of the LDCs
- rationalise agricultural production but in the interim, facilitate the marketing of selected agricultural products of particular interest to the LDCs (through the Agricultural Marketing Protocol); and
- provide a longer period to phase out customs duty on certain products which were more important for the revenue of the LDCs

Although CARIFTA itself was limited to trade in goods, it freed approximately 90% of intra-regional trade in manufactured goods and instituted managed intra-regional trade in some agricultural products. Between 1968 and 1973 the absolute trade, diversity of traded goods and the significance of intra-CARIFTA trade relative to external markets all increased notably. Intra-CARIFTA imports rose from EC$95 million in 1968 to EC$300 million in 1973. Whilst foodstuff and petroleum products accounted for the bulk of this trade, a range of new manufactured items (particularly from Jamaica and Trinidad & Tobago) began to be supplied for the first time. Diversification not only occurred in the types of goods sold but in the matrix of trade relationships with Jamaica's trade expanding away from the traditional markets of Belize and the northern Caribbean towards the southern and eastern Caribbean while Trinidad & Tobago's trade concurrently expanded from the traditional markets of Guyana and the Eastern Caribbean towards Jamaica, Belize and the northern Caribbean. Additionally the LDCs, particularly Saint Lucia, Dominica and St. Vincent & the Grenadines benefitted from increase exports to the More Developed Countries (MDCs - Barbados, Guyana, Jamaica, and Trinidad & Tobago) of ground provisions (like sweet potatoes), copra and raw oils (such as coconut oil) under the Agricultural Marketing Protocol and the Oil and Fats Agreement (which was initially an Agreement among some regional states that pre-dated CARIFTA but was incorporated into CARIFTA as a Protocol and extended to all CARIFTA members in 1970) respectively.

Overall for CARIFTA members intra-CARIFTA trade went from accounting for around 6% of total domestic exports in 1967 to constituting 9% of domestic exports in 1970 (total domestic imports from intra-CARIFTA trade remained general stable at around 5%), even as the share trade with more traditional markets fluctuated and generally declined:

| Markets | Exports, 1967 (% of total exports) | Exports, 1971 (% of total exports) | Imports, 1967 (% of total imports) | Imports, 1971 (% of total imports) |
|---|---|---|---|---|
| United Kingdom | 20.9 | 16.0 | 20.2 | 18.7 |
| United States | 38.0 | 36.5 | 25.5 | 26.5 |
| Canada | 8.6 | 5.4 | 8.7 | 5.4 |
| Latin America | 2.7 | 3.1 | 20.0 | 8.1 |
| European Economic Community | 3.7 | 2.4 | 7.6 | 6.9 |
| CARIFTA | 6.4 | 9.2 | 4.9 | 4.5 |
| Others | 19.7 | 25.4 | 13.1 | 29.8 |

Broken down by the MDC and LDC designations, the MDC territories experienced 77% growth of intra-CARIFTA exports over four years (with Jamaica's export trade expanding the most, growing by 46% in exports and 24% in imports for the period 1967–1969) and the LDC territories saw 35% growth in intra-CARIFTA exports over the same period.

By the time CARIFTA was officially wound up in mid-1974 both intra-CARIFTA imports and exports had risen more than four-fold compared to 1966, with intra-CARIFTA imports increasing from EC$89 million to EC$473 million (433% increase) and intra-CARIFTA exports increasing from EC$82 million in 1966 to EC$455 million in 1974 (a 457% increase). The equivalent statistics for total trade with all partners by contrast showed a three-fold increase with imports increasing from EC$1.862 billion in 1966 to EC$7.141 billion in 1974 (a 284% increase) and exports increasing from EC$1.4 billion to EC$6.3 billion (a 350% increase) over the same period. This indicates that CARIFTA was successful in creating trade rather than merely diverting trade with the Free Trade Area.

=== Inter-Regional Settlements Agreement ===
On November 26, 1969 the central banks of Guyana, Jamaica, and Trinidad and Tobago jointly announced the institution of an Inter-Regional Settlements Agreement (also known as the Intra-Regional Payments Scheme) aimed at facilitating and reducing the cost of making payments from trade among CARIFTA states. The Agreement became operational on December 1, 1969 between those three countries; while the remaining CARIFTA states of Antigua and Barbuda, Barbados, Dominica, Grenada, Saint Kitts and Nevis, Saint Lucia, Saint Vincent and the Grenadines, and Montserrat were intended to join the scheme on January 19, 1970. However, all of these states except Barbados did not actually join the scheme until February 1970 and Barbados itself joined in May 1972. Belize (having been renamed from British Honduras in 1973) joined in February 1976.

This Inter-Regional Settlements Agreement expanded upon pre-existing arrangements between CARIFTA states for dealing with their regional currencies (exchanging their various currency notes and coins) by allowing for the purchasing and selling of regional currencies via bank transfers. This would enable the regional monetary authorities to facilitate regional commercial banks in concluding final settlements between themselves locally rather than having such payments done through London as was the practice up to that time. In turn this allowed commercial banks to offer better rates of exchange and settlement in the regional currencies to their customers. The new arrangement also allowed for the desired increase in international liquidity for the CARIFTA states be formally making CARIFTA currencies convertible within the CARIFTA Area. This was considered a necessity as the volume of intra-CARIFTA trade increased.

However, under the Scheme the various CARIFTA central banks or monetary authorities effected settlements with each other individually, with each member extended an interest-free maximum credit line of £100,000 and outstanding net balances being settled quarterly by actual currency exchange (in Pounds Sterling). In 1974 the individual credit lines were increased to £500,000 (or approximately US$1.160 million) and in 1976, total credit in the arrangements was increased to US$40 million.

The Settlements Agreement facilitated the flow of regional trade, conserved the region's international reserves, and encouraged the integration of the regional banking systems. The settlement on a quarterly basis significantly reduced the previously erratic changes in foreign exchange reserves of the participating member states caused by having to settle at least once a day in both directions prior to the scheme (to pay for imports and receive funds from exports).

The Inter-Regional Settlements Agreement would continue past CARIFTA's transformation into CARICOM and eventually be replaced in April 1977 by the CARICOM Multilateral Clearing Facility and its concomitant traveller's cheques facility. This transformation was due to the fact that though the Scheme worked satisfactorily, it was cumbersome due to the need of each of the 6 participating monetary authorities to keep individual accounts for all of the other participants and the growth of intra-regional trade requiring an increase in the volume of credit to be provided. Additionally, despite all countries extending credit on a bilateral basis, Trinidad and Tobago became the only net creditor within the Scheme.

== Membership ==
In 1965, on December 15, the CARIFTA was founded by 3 countries:

- Antigua and Barbuda (1965)
- Barbados (1965)
- Guyana (1965)

The following countries joined the agreement:

- Trinidad and Tobago (May 1, 1968)
- Dominica (July 1, 1968)
- Grenada (July 1, 1968)
- Saint Kitts and Nevis (July 1, 1968)
- Saint Lucia (July 1, 1968)
- Saint Vincent and the Grenadines (July 1, 1968)
- Jamaica (August 1, 1968)
- Montserrat (August 1, 1968)
- British Honduras (Belize) (May 1, 1971)

In the 1970s, around the time CARIFTA was being transformed into CARICOM the following countries were granted Liaison Status/Observer Status in the Association:

- Suriname (March 1973)
- Netherlands Antilles (July 1973)

=== Potential Members ===
==== The Bahamas ====
Although never a member of the Association itself, The Bahamas had begun involvement in the regional cooperation and integration initiative through participation in the Heads of Government Conferences of the Commonwealth Caribbean starting in 1966. This participation was quite active with The Bahamas' Premier, Lynden Pindling, sharing experiences and offering suggestions with regard to the establishment and operation of a regional air carrier at the 1969 Conference, and with The Bahamas (along with Belize which was not as yet a member of the Association) being invited to participate in the initial meeting (and in all future discussions) of the regional Ministers of Education in regards to the establishment of the Caribbean Examinations Council and the overall regional plan for cooperation in education at the 1970 Heads of Government Conference. The Bahamas was also quite involved in the transformation of CARIFTA into the Caribbean Community, with the 1972 Conference (at which it was agreed to form the Caribbean Community) appointing a Committee of Attorneys-General of all CARIFTA member states and the Bahamas to review the legal implications of establishing the Community itself and to prepare a draft Treaty for creating the Community. The 1972 Conference also agreed to deepen fiscal, financial and monetary cooperation within the Commonwealth Caribbean and to that end established a Standing Committee of Ministers of Finance of CARIFTA member states and The Bahamas as a permanent institution for regional economic cooperation. In April 1973, at the final meeting of the Commonwealth Caribbean Heads of Government before the establishment of the Caribbean Community, the Conference welcomed the upcoming independence of The Bahamas in July 1973 and looked forward to its participation in the Caribbean Community.

==== The Netherlands Antilles and Surinam ====
While initially envisaged as being potential members of a Caribbean Economic Community by Trinidad & Tobago's Prime Minister, Dr. Eric Williams, when he first enunciated such a vision in January 1962, the talks between Trinidad & Tobago and Surinam (as it was then called until 1978 when it officially changed its name to Suriname) and the Netherlands Antilles in March 1962 were not successful. These two Dutch Caribbean territories (at the time) were however also invited, prior to 1968, to become founding members of CARIFTA, but Surinam declined as it was uncertain as to the implications of joining and the Netherlands Antilles also declined out of caution against being the only non-Commonwealth member Following CARIFTA's foundation however, Jamaica's Prime Minister, Hugh Shearer found on a tour of the Dutch Caribbean in August 1968, that the Minister-President of the Netherlands Antilles, Ciro Domenico Kroon and the Prime Minister of Suriname, Johan Adolf Pengel both expressed an interest in their respective territories joining CARIFTA in the future.

==== Haiti and the Dominican Republic ====
In January 1970, at the fifth meeting of the CARIFTA Council, Trinidad and Tobago proposed that the Bahamas, Haiti and the Dominican Republic be admitted as members of CARIFTA. This proposal was generally positively received. The inclusion of those states would have expanded CARIFTA's market by 8.5 million people and increased the subscribed capital of the Caribbean Development Bank (which had been linked with the formation and operation of CARIFTA) by approximately US$17 million. By 1971 however, Errol Barrow, Prime Minister of Barbados, saw no real advantage in including Haiti and the Dominican Republic (and Cuba) in CARIFTA unless a quota system was applied to their products as he considered their economies to be duplicate to those of the existing CARFITA states.

The Dominican Republic first signaled its intention to join a regional economic bloc at the a Summit of American leaders in Uruguay in April 1967 when it signed the Declaration of the Presidents of America. This Declaration outlined the aim for the creation of Latin American Common Market through the vehicles of the Latin American Free Trade Association (LAFTA) and Central American Common Market (CACM). Subsequently, the Dominican Republic looked into both LAFTA and the CACM, before pursuing discussions on joining CARIFTA in 1970. However the discussions did not result in Dominican membership before CARIFTA was ended in favour of forming CARICOM in 1973–1974.

==== Other States ====
At the 1972 Conference of Commonwealth Caribbean Heads of Government, consideration was given to widening CARIFTA but the immediate priority was agreed to be to improve the position of the less developed territories in the Association and to study the possibilities of including all the Caribbean islands and Suriname in the integration movement.

== Organization ==
While the original 1965 CARIFTA Agreement was mostly modelled on the 1960 European Free Trade Association Agreement, and the subsequent 1967 Agreement was suitably modified to reflect membership encompassing most of the Commonwealth Caribbean, the Association itself was governed more like the European Economic Community (EEC) with a mix of formal institutions set up by the Agreement and informal institutions outside the scope of the Agreement although like EFTA, the formal institutions prescribed in the CARIFTA Agreement were simple and flexible.

=== Heads of Government Conference ===
Similarly to the European Council the regional Heads of Government Conference started off as an informal summit of leaders and later as an independent, formal summit of leaders that was still informal with regard to the regional integration organization over which it had some amount of direction. Unlike the European Council with regard to the EEC however, the regional Heads of Government Conference pre-dates CARIFTA (and then CARICOM), having first convened in 1963 in Port-of-Spain, Trinidad & Tobago. Having expanded its membership from just the independent Commonwealth Caribbean states in 1963 to including all of the non-independent territories in 1967, it was the Heads of Government Conference at its fourth sitting in October 1967 in Bridgetown, Barbados that modified the Dickenson Bay Agreement so as to ensure the broadest possible membership, set 1 May 1968 as day CARIFTA was supposed to become operation and set forth a Resolution on Regional Integration which was incorporated as an integral part of the CARIFTA Agreement as Annex A.

In regards to the CARIFTA and the wider regional integration movement, the Heads of Government Conference was the ultimate body which gave direction to the regional integration, established committees and working parties to examine certain issues pertaining to regional integration, approved the budget of the Commonwealth Caribbean Regional Secretariat, and informally was needed to expressly approve any new major initiatives of the formal CARIFTA institutions.

The Heads of Government Conference would be formalized as an Organ of CARIFTA's successor organization, CARICOM, with the Original Treaty of Chaguaramas of July 1973.

=== Council ===
The CARIFTA Council is analogous to the EFTA Council of Ministers, and was set up under Article 28 of the CARIFTA Agreement with each member territory being represented on the council and having one vote. Council decisions and recommendations were made by unanimous vote, except where the Agreement provides otherwise, in which case it could act by a majority vote consisting of two-thirds of the member territories.

Besides administering the CARIFTA Agreement, the council was also empowered to settle disputes arising from the CARIFTA Agreement (whether between member territories for originating from within a member territory) and thus it also acted as tribunal when necessary. In that way it could authorize any member territory to take interim safe-guard measures and suspend its obligations towards another member territory if the second member territory was determined by the Council not to be fulfilling its obligations stemming from the CARIFTA Agreement.

=== Commonwealth Caribbean Regional Secretariat ===
The Commonwealth Caribbean Regional Secretariat was the principal administrative organ of the Association, being established under Article 28 (3) of the Agreement, and it could be entrusted by the council with such functions or delegated authority as the Council considered necessary to assist it in accomplishing its tasks. The role of the Secretariat was to service both the Heads of Government Conference and the council, ensuring implementation of resolutions and decisions and to make studies concerning trade expansion or as assigned to it by the Conference or the council and make recommendations on matters within its competence.

The Secretariat itself was divided into two Divisions. The first was the Trade and Integration Division which supervised the workings of the CARIFTA Agreement including collecting, collating and analyzing regional statistics and economic data as well as improving customs procedures and training customs personnel. The second was the General Services and Administrative Division which held responsibility for the general administration of the Secretariat and the non-economic aspects of regional integration such as education, health, meteorology, shipping and so on.

== Transformation and legacy ==
In 1973, CARIFTA became superseded by the Caribbean Community (CARICOM) following a decision, at the Seventh Heads of Government Conference in October 1972, to transform CARIFTA into a Common Market and establish the Caribbean Community of which the Common Market would be an integral part. At the Eighth Heads of Government Conference in April 1973, the Georgetown Accord was adopted, which set out the details of how CARIFTA was to be replaced by CARICOM. The Treaty of Chaguaramas declared that CARIFTA would cease to exist on 1 May 1974 when the remaining CARIFTA members all acceded to CARICOM. In fact, there was essentially a transitional period between 1 August 1973 when the More Developed Countries (MDCs) of Barbados, Guyana, Jamaica, and Trinidad & Tobago acceded to CARICOM and 26 July 1974 when Saint Kitts & Nevis acceded to CARICOM, during which both CARIFTA and CARICOM were legally in existence and operative and thus CARIFTA wasn't fully superseded until 26 July 1974. In conjunction with their accession to CARICOM, the various CARIFTA states gave notices of withdrawal from CARIFTA which brought about the legal termination of CARIFTA's provisions within their jurisdictions and ultimately the complete legal dissolution of CARIFTA itself. Thus the dates of withdrawal from CARIFTA are as follows:

- 30 April 1974 - Barbados, Guyana, Jamaica, and Trinidad & Tobago
- October 1974 - Belize, Dominica, Grenada, Saint Kitts-Nevis-Anguilla, Saint Lucia, and Saint Vincent & the Grenadines
- January 1975 - Montserrat
- July 1975 - Antigua & Barbuda

The regional co-operation under the CARIFTA agreement also led to the foundation of several common institutions. The Commonwealth Caribbean Regional Secretariat was set up in Georgetown (Guyana) and the Caribbean Development Bank was established in Bridgetown, Barbados.

One of the legacies of CARIFTA is an international youth athletics event for junior athletes from the member states started in 1972 by the association and inaugurated (and thought up) by Austin Sealy (then president of the Amateur Athletic Association of Barbados) to mark the transition from CARIFTA to CARICOM called the CARIFTA Games. In 1985, a similar set of games, The CARIFTA Aquatics Championships, started.

== See also ==
- CARIFTA Games
- CARIFTA Swimming Championships
- Latin American economy
