= Projects of the Caribbean Community =

Projects of the Caribbean Community include:

== Single market and economy ==
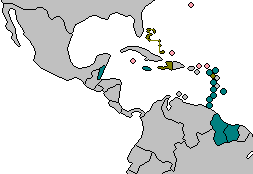
CARICOM members part of CSM CARICOM members not part of CSM CARICOM associate members

Three countries—Barbados, Jamaica and Trinidad and Tobago—had originally set 5 January 2005 as the date of signing the agreement relating to the CARICOM single market and economy (CSME). The ceremony had then been rescheduled to coincide with 19 February 2005 inauguration of the new CARICOM-headquarters building in Georgetown, Guyana, but this was later postponed after a ruling by the London Privy council caused alarm to several Caribbean countries.

The prospect was that ten of the remaining twelve CARICOM countries would join the CSME by the end of 2005. The Bahamas and Haiti were not expected to be a part of the new economic arrangement at that time. The CARICOM Secretariat maintains frequent contact with another organisation named the Organisation of Eastern Caribbean States (OECS), which represents seven Full members and two Associate members of CARICOM in the Eastern Caribbean. Many of the OECS countries are seeking to maintain themselves as a micro-economic grouping within CARICOM.

The CARICOM Single Market and Economy treaty finally went into effect on 1 January 2006, with Barbados, Belize, Jamaica, Guyana, Suriname and Trinidad and Tobago as the first full members. On 3 July 2006, the total membership was brought up to twelve when Antigua and Barbuda, Dominica, Grenada, St. Kitts and Nevis, St. Lucia, and St. Vincent and the Grenadines became full members. The British overseas territory of Montserrat is seeking permission from the United Kingdom to become a part of the single market; Haiti will not join the market initially because of its difficult internal political situation; and the Bahamas will not join because of local opposition to a provision that allows skilled workers to move more easily among nations.

== Common passport ==
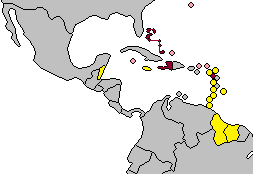
Members with common passport implemented Members without common passport Associate members

As of early 2009 twelve Member States have introduced CARICOM passports. These states are Antigua and Barbuda, Barbados, Belize, Dominica, Grenada, Guyana, Jamaica, St. Kitts and Nevis, St. Lucia, St. Vincent and the Grenadines, Suriname and Trinidad and Tobago. CARICOM members yet to issue the common passports are Bahamas, Montserrat and Haiti. Citizens of Montserrat are citizens of the United Kingdom, so it is unlikely that the common passport will be introduced there.

The CARICOM passport creates awareness that CARICOM nationals are nationals of the Community, as well as a specific country.

== Reciprocal social-security agreement ==
On 1 March 1996, the CARICOM Agreement on Social Security was signed in Georgetown, Guyana and it came into effect on 1 April 1997. From that date persons have been eligible to apply for and receive benefits under the Agreement. The agreement is intended to protect CARICOM nationals' entitlement to benefits and provide equality of treatment when moving from one country to another. The agreement is seen as key in facilitating the free movement of labour within the CARICOM Single Market, but it applies to all persons who are moving to work or have worked in two or more countries that have implemented the agreement including any which are not a part of the Single Market.

The agreement is in effect in the following CARICOM Member States: Antigua and Barbuda, The Bahamas, Barbados, Belize, Dominica, Grenada, Guyana, Jamaica, Montserrat, St. Kitts and Nevis, Saint Lucia, St. Vincent and The Grenadines, and Trinidad and Tobago. It is not in effect in Suriname or Haiti.

The agreement allows CARICOM countries to coordinate their social security programmes and provides for payments of death benefits and of pensions for invalidity, disablement, old age/retirement and survivors’ benefits.

A CARICOM national who is a wage earner, must be insured in the Member State where he or she is employed and must therefore make contributions to the respective social security organization. He/She is entitled to the same benefits as nationals of the host country.

When going to another CARICOM member state to work, persons should inform the directors of the social security organizations in their home country and host country. The date of departure and overseas address should be presented. This enables the accurate capturing of contributions and payment of benefits while residing in the host country. One should also inform that organization of any subsequent change of address. Upon returning to the usual place of residence, the home organization should be notified.

If a CARICOM national is insured under the scheme of one country, e.g. Jamaica, and at the same time that national is permitted to voluntary contribute to another compulsory insurance scheme, the national will be insured under the first country's scheme only (in this case Jamaica).

If the CARICOM national is permitted to voluntarily contribute to two or more compulsory insurance schemes, that national is entitled to be insured under the scheme in the country where he/she resides. If he/she does not live in one of the CARICOM countries, he/she should be insured under the scheme of the country where he/she last worked.

Migrant or travelling workers are usually at a disadvantage when they leave a particular country without making sufficient contributions to qualify for benefits. The agreement therefore also ensures that the rights and obligations of certain workers are secured. Hence, the social-security schemes require all employed persons to register and to make National Insurance contributions to the respective social security organization. The categories of workers covered under the Agreement are as follows:

- Workers in Transnational Enterprises
- Workers in International Transport
- Workers on Ships
- Workers in Diplomatic Missions, Consulates and International Organizations
- Self-employed Persons
- Itinerant Workers (Workers travelling from country to country)

The Agreement protects all entitlements to long term benefits by providing for the totaling of all the contributions which were paid to the respective Social Security Organizations in Member States, where a national previously worked. Suriname is the exception since it does not have a comparable social security system.

In the event of a withdrawal from or termination of the CARICOM Social Security Agreement, all rights acquired will be maintained/honoured and negotiations will take place for the settlement of any rights.

== Caribbean exchange network (CXN) ==
The proposal for a regional trading platform or stock exchange was initially raised in 1989, and then again in the 1990s during ongoing discussions for the Caribbean Single Market and Economy, but it was not realized. In 2006 the idea was again brought up in a regional stock market conference. At the conference it was noted that at the time the region contained several small separate Caribbean stock exchanges including that of Bahamas, Barbados, the Eastern Caribbean (itself a regional securities exchange), Guyana, Jamaica, Suriname, and Trinidad & Tobago, each with relatively high transaction costs, low liquidity, a relatively small number of listed companies, and a few securities dominating trading on an exchange, while legislation and trading rules varied across the region. It was argued that the best way to improve liquidity was through a common trading platform approach, with CARICOM-wide connectivity using state-of-the-art technology connecting local brokers (intermediaries) in the multiple stock markets through a single network. This would create a fair and well-informed market for financial securities, and ultimately an internationally competitive market. By interconnecting the stock exchanges of the region a single regional capital market would be created. It would also avoid one of the main hurdles against having a single Caribbean Stock Exchange, that being the fact that the established Exchanges were not likely to make themselves voluntarily redundant. It would also widen the scope of operations of all the regional exchanges as each participating exchange would give their brokers access to the companies listed on all the others' boards.

Work continued on the establishment of the system, now dubbed the Caribbean Exchange Network (CXN) with initial hopes that it could be implemented by late 2007 with approximately 120 listed securities. However that timetable was dependent on how quickly securities regulators in Jamaica, Trinidad and Barbados could sign off on the enabling documents and agreements on which they have asked for clarifications. By December 2007 regulators were still mulling over the documents and the hope was for full implementation in 2008. The 3 April 2008 start-up date was missed as a result of takeover activity in the region's capital markets (involving companies such as WIBISCO, FirstCaribbean, Barbados Farms, the takeover bidding process for Barbados Shipping & Trading by Trinidadian industrial giant Neal & Massy and Royal Bank of Canada's buyout of RBTT) and delay on the part of regulators. An agreement in 2008 to have the Bank of Nova Scotia as the settlement bank for regional stock market trades also later fell through. Instead of a single settlement bank, each member dealer will now have to make arrangement to get their transaction settled either with their local national central bank or any other commercial bank of choice Up to 2008, the Jamaica, Barbados and Trinidad & Tobago stock exchanges had collectively invested US$150,000 on the project.

All outstanding issues were finally settled in January 2011 and the CXN got the approval of the various regional regulators and made its operational debut. The CXN trading platform and support infrastructure had been in place since 2007. It is now expected that trading on the platform will begin in 2012. The CXN will allow brokers in each jurisdiction to access all the stock within the region from their desks, irrespective of where they are. But in the absence of a monetary union for Caricom they must transact the business in the currency of the home market of the listed security – for example, a Jamaican buying a TT stock would have to settle in TT dollars, with the security being held in the TT central securities depository.

The initial participants in the CXN are the Jamaica, Barbados and Trinidad and Tobago stock exchanges with other jurisdictions are expected to join over time. Modeled off the NOREX alliance, the CXN is governed by the Regional Caribbean Exchanges Network Agreement (to which the Jamaica, Barbados and Trinidad & Tobago stock exchanges are parties), Bank Settlement Service Agreement for the Caribbean Exchanges Network, Trading Access Agreement, CXN Broker-Client Agreement, and Deed of Accession. The CXN is aimed at providing benefits for consumers and firms in terms of investment, operating costs, products and services and through reduction in administrative burden. It also aims to pull together the small fragmented markets in CARICOM; improve liquidity; enhance price discovery; encourage greater participation by Issuers, Intermediaries, and Investors; foster the growth of the domestic financial services sector; provide savers with greater opportunities to protect themselves against inflation; provide an additional channel for encouraging and mobilizing domestic savings; increase the overall efficiency of investment; and help reduce corporate dependence on borrowing and improve the gearing of the regional corporate sector. Trading by broker participants of the CXN takes place on the common state-of-the-art trading platform which gives the brokers access to an electronic order book for each company listed on the participant exchanges. Intermediaries will log into a participant exchange's trading system and via an electronic gateway, place order(s) on that exchange. Settlement by brokers on CXN takes place in the common clearing and settlement system. This system gives brokers access to real-time client account information, electronic share book and other reporting facilities. The clearance and settlement platform is tightly coupled with the trading system which facilitates real-time inventory and account verification. In this tightly coupled environment, when an order entry occurs in the trading system, the settlement system will check to ensure that the participant inventory stipulated in the order exists. The result of this is that in order to sell shares in a particular jurisdiction the shares must be held in the depository of that jurisdiction. The three original participating exchanges already facilitate this process of transfer for cross-listed securities called Inter-CSD movements.

In 2017 another step in the process occurred when Securities Trading Technology (from South Africa) created the Avvento Trader engine as the envisioned shared platform for the three participating exchanges. However, by mid 2018, although the exchanges began utilizing the Avvento Trader platform and the three securities regulators themselves had amended the rules to provide for seamless trading by allowing brokers from other participating territories to be registered and trade within the home market, non-tariff barriers had not yet been removed. This prevented brokers in each market from trading beyond their home market. So currently brokers in each territory still have to use another broker in another territory to finalize a transaction, despite the rules and infrastructure existing to facilitate trading directly via the CXN platform. This had elicited calls for mutual recognition of brokers, to obviate the need to register with more than one regulator in order to trade in more than one market. In addition to issues with registration, there were also issues stemming from foreign exchange controls in Barbados and Trinidad & Tobago.

== Hassle-free travel ==
In the Grand Anse Declaration of 1989, Heads of Government agreed that from December 1990 all CARICOM nationals should be free to travel within the Community without the need for passports.

The overwhelmingly popular support for this decision was conveyed to the West Indian Commission time and time again throughout its consultations and as a result, the issue of hassle-free travel was identified by the Commission in its 1991 Progress Report, as one of the six areas for immediate action.

Hassle Free Travel refers to the freedom of CARICOM nationals to travel "into and within the jurisdiction of any Member State without harassment or the imposition of impediment". This is intended to foster a greater sense of community. It is also designed to encourage greater intra-CARICOM tourism.

Implementing hassle free travel has not proven as easy as might be expected, however, given the need to reconcile the differing requirements within member states (between the immigration and tourism departments, for example) and among Member States. The forms of identification that are acceptable to some Member States include: travel permits; ID cards with photographs; birth certificates; and, drivers’ licences. However, among the countries which accept these forms of identification, limits are still imposed with respect to the specific countries whose nationals will be allowed to use the facility.

Two accompanying elements of hassle free travel are the use of common embarkation and disembarkation cards (E/D Cards), i.e. the forms which all persons entering member states are required to complete (commonly referred to as immigration forms/cards), and the establishment of common lines at ports of entry for citizens, residents and CARICOM nationals. These lines are in place in all member mtates apart from The Bahamas. In The Bahamas, people entering the country are free to use any line.

At the 28th meeting of the Conference of Heads of Government in July 2007 the conference agreed that CARICOM nationals should be allowed an automatic six-month stay on arrival in another CARICOM Member State. Antigua and Barbuda entered a reservation in this regard.

In a landmark ruling the Caribbean Court of Justice, acting in its original jurisdiction, awarded Jamaican national, Shanique Myrie, Bds$75,000 (US$37,500) damages to be paid by the government of Barbados. The CCJ found that Myrie had been wrongfully denied entry into Barbados, subjected to a humiliating cavity search and unlawfully detained overnight in a cell and expelled from Barbados. In the course of its judgment, the CCJ laid out clear rules for the treatment of Caribbean nationals travelling throughout the region and held that, unlike third country nationals, all CARICOM nationals (including those seeking entry pursuant to any of the free movement regimes i.e. Skilled Nationals, Right of Establishment and Provision of Services) have a right to enter another CARICOM country for an automatic stay of six months "hassle free" or "without harassment or the imposition of impediments".

This right, the court stated, was derived from the Revised Treaty of Chaguaramas (RTC) and the 2007 CARICOM decision made at the twenty-eighth meeting of the conference of heads of government of CARICOM.

The CCJ has also outlined the grounds on which immigration and border officials across the region can deny access to CARICOM nationals. The two exceptions to this right to an automatic six-month stay and hassle free travel "without harassment or the imposition of impediments", which permits a Member State's immigration and border officials to refuse entry or a six-month stay are:

- where the CARICOM national is undesirable, or
- to prevent the CARICOM national from becoming a charge on the public purse.

However, immigration officials must apply these exceptions narrowly and on a case-by-case basis. Barbadian officials highlighted several areas where Myrie herself had questionable circumstances in her attempt to enter Barbados. Despite this, Member States must ensure that they adhere to Community law and standards in relation to the right of entry, even where their national laws may differ. The Court provided guidance for the application of these exceptions.

The CCJ has stated that to consider a CARICOM national "undesirable" he/she must be a genuine, present and sufficiently serious threat affecting one of the fundamental interests of society, such as the protection of public morals, maintenance of public order and safety, protection of life and health. The CCJ also suggested that a reasonable test for assessing such a threat is that, as a starting point, it must be shown that the visitor poses a threat to engage in activity prohibited by national law, and that nationals who engage in such activity are also prosecuted or sanctioned.

A CARICOM member state is also entitled to assess on a strict, narrow, case-by-case basis whether a visiting CARICOM National may become a charge on public funds during his/her stay in the country. An assessment of whether a CARICOM national is likely to become a charge on the public purse may consider whether the national appears to be in a position to support himself during his intended length of stay. The CCJ has indicated that in seeking to make such an assessment it is reasonable for authorities to assess whether the community national has sufficient funds for the period the visitor intends to stay (as evidenced by his return ticket). The relevant factors may include cash, credit cards, access to funds, or being hosted in the receiving country. However, the court has made it clear that it is not reasonable to require a visiting community national to show sufficiency of funds for a period of six months if the national does not intend to stay that long. Immigration officials may therefore ask to see the return ticket, as evidence of the intended length of stay. If the national does not have a valid return ticket, the national may be given the opportunity to obtain one.

In the general application of the right of definite entry, that the purpose of the visit is irrelevant, once it is not unlawful.

Other than the above exceptions which are to be interpreted strictly and narrowly, every CARICOM national is entitled to be admitted to enter a CARICOM country and for his passport to be stamped for six months, regardless of his intended length of visit (in-transit, meeting, visa request or otherwise). He is also within his rights to extend the duration of his ticket within the six-month period if he so desires.

CARICOM nationals who are granted a six months definite stay cannot automatically –

- stay indefinitely
- take up residence
- work without permission
- provide services
- establish a business

A CARICOM national who wishes to stay beyond six months or conduct the above activities in another CARICOM country can only do so pursuant to the relevant community regime, or national laws. A CARICOM national who wishes to change his/her status as a visitor during his stay, must apply to the appropriate authorities and provide the required documentation, as a CARICOM skilled national or a service provider, or apply for a work permit or permission to reside. A member state that receives such an application would do so in accordance with national law and community law.

Where a CARICOM national is being refused entry into another CARICOM country, the CCJ determined that the right to hassle free travel requires that the following procedures should be applied:

- The state must promptly give written reasons for a decision to refuse entry.
- The state must inform the community national of his or her right to challenge the decision.
- The state must provide an effective and accessible appeal or review procedure with adequate safeguards to protect the rights of the person denied entry both administrative and judicial.
- CARICOM nationals refused entry should have an opportunity to consult an attorney or a consular official of their country or to contact a family member.

CARICOM member states are required to ensure that the above procedures are applied, whether through legislation or administrative action.

Following the Myrie verdict, it was announced that the Caribbean Court of Justice may lack power to enforce the ruling on Barbados or any other state. However, some member states have already undertaken steps to implement the recommendations of the ruling and the ruling itself was discussed by the member states' Attorneys-General at the CARICOM Legal Affairs Committee meeting on 29 November 2013 and was further discussed at the CARICOM Fourteenth Meeting of Officials on Free Movement of Skills and Facilitation of Travel, held from 11 to 12 December 2013 in Guyana. At that meeting it was emphasized that the exemptions to the right of entry, identified in the judgment of the Caribbean Court of Justice, in the Shanique Myrie case, should be narrowly interpreted by the state.

The Jamaican Foreign Affairs Ministry noted that the Secretariat has also been instructed to intensify the training and sensitization of immigration officials across the region, as soon as possible. It was agreed that Security, Legal and Immigration officials would also meet to formulate recommendations on implementation of the CCJ and related issues. The recommendations are expected to be presented at the next meeting of the Prime Ministerial Sub-Committee on CSME issues.

In December 2014 and continuing through January 2015, Grenadian personnel from Customs, Immigration, Business and Investment agencies and the Ministries of Tourism and Culture took the opportunity to participate in a CSME refresher training session hosted by the Ministry of Foreign Affairs. These worksite meetings were designed specifically for officers from the Public Service and businesses that administer processes, advise their clients with respect to Free Movement of People, Capital, Goods, Services and the Right of Establishment CSME regimes, or benefit from these rights.

According to Foreign Officer Phillip the training is geared to ensure that Grenadians can move, work and explore opportunities in the CARICOM Single Market (CSM) and that all CARICOM Member States participating in the CSME adhere to the Shanique Myrie ruling of the Caribbean Court of Justice (CCJ) concerning the acceptable standards for the treatment of CARICOM nationals at the border.

“It is incumbent upon each of us to know what was articulated by the Heads and enshrined into (CARICOM) Community Law, because in matters to do with the CSME Regimes, Community Law supersedes National Law. To do otherwise will be to infringe on the rights of CARICOM nationals, and cause Grenada to be in breach of the Revised Treaty of Chaguaramus and the rulings of the CCJ.", the Officer said.

Reinforcing the importance of information sharing through channels like technical Worksite Meetings, Foreign Service Officer Mrs. Commodore indicated that it is only when Grenadians attempt to access the CSME regimes, can the systems and procedures be tested and refined, and case studies be used for further learning since CSME implementation will continue to be in process for a while. Acknowledging that human error existed and that sometimes mistakes can be made, she noted that even when such instances occur that it was necessary as professionals for these personnel to own up to the mistakes quickly, apologize and regularize the situation as quickly as possible to avert crisis situations such as the Shanique Myrie case.

=== Visa free travel for Haitians ===
Following the CARICOM Heads of Government Conference hosted by Haiti in February 2018, it was agreed by all Member States that measures would be adopted to extend to all Haitians the opportunity to travel hassle-free within the Community. Among the first steps to be taken in this regard is the waiving of the requirement by Haitians to hold visas of the other Member States (where this requirement still exists and has not yet been abolished) if they hold valid United States, Canadian or Schengen visas, with effect from March 30, 2018.

=== Travel card ===
At the 28th CARICOM Heads of Government Conference in Barbados it was agreed to implement a CARICOM travel card that will be issued to every CARICOM national except those on the Community's watch list. An implementation plan for the document will be put together and submitted to the Heads at the next inter-sessional meeting to be held in September. The card will virtually maintain the 'single domestic space' and holders will not need a passport, during inter-community travel. The card will also allow a CARICOM national an automatic six-month stay in any territory within the bloc. It is not expected to affect the security of the member countries, as any holder will be deported if he or she breaks the law. Similar to the "Pass Cards" available in other parts of the world, the new card would be the size of a credit card and will feature facial and fingerprinting biometrics – so upon arrival at an airport, travellers can swipe the card in the machine which will open the barrier allowing them to walk through. The development and implementation of the CARIPASS travel card has been described by St. Kitts and Nevis Prime Minister Roosevelt Skerrit as a "major step towards hassle-free travel". In addition to being available to all CARICOM nationals, the card would be available to expatriates who have legal status in a member country. Their card would be time-bound in a way that is linked exclusively to the time of their legal status. The cost of acquiring the card is to yet be determined, but the country leaders have agreed that the proceeds would go towards offsetting the cost of enhanced security at the ports.

== Caribbean arrest warrant ==
At the 28th Conference of the Heads of Government in July 2007, CARICOM leaders discussed the issue of crime and security and agreed to the implementation of a CARICOM Arrest Warrant Treaty (CAWT) and CARICOM Maritime and Airspace Agreement which were expected to be finalized by September 2007. By April 2008, the Arrest Warrant Treaty was ready to be signed at the next annual summit in St. John's, Antigua. At the 29th Conference of the Heads of Government in July 2008 the CARICOM Arrest Warrant Treaty along with other agreements that were ready at the time (including the Agreement Establishing the Caribbean Aviation Safety and Security Oversight System (CASSOS); the Agreement Establishing Caribbean Disaster Emergency Management Agency (CDEMA); the Agreement Establishing the Caribbean Development Fund (CDF) and the Maritime and Airspace Security Co-operation Agreement) were signed by some member states, namely Antigua & Barbuda and Trinidad & Tobago.

The objective of the CAWT (which is similar to that of the European Arrest Warrant) is to establish within CARICOM a system of arrest and surrender of requested persons for the purposes of:

- Conducting a criminal prosecution for an applicable offence; or
- Executing a custodial sentence where the requested persons have fled from justice after being sentence for an applicable offence.

Later in 2009 three more member states (Suriname, St. Lucia and St. Kitts & Nevis) signed on to the treaty. In January 2013, the St. Lucian Commissioner of Police, Vernon Francis, called on all CARICOM members to fully sign on to and implement the treaty. He stated it was imperative given the widespread "increase in criminal activity we are seeing within the Community and ubiquitous nature of organized crime" and noted that "the full implementation of the pact will help to bring criminals to justice". In February 2013, Trinidad & Tobago's Prime Minister, Kamla Persad-Bissessar, listed a number of initiatives, aimed at addressing crime in the Caribbean as a whole, which were agreed to at the Caricom Heads of Government meeting in Haiti. These included measures which would be adopted by the United States and CARICOM member states to address the issue of crime in the Caribbean as well as the adoption of a Regional Crime and Security Strategy. One of the strategic goals of this Crime and Security Strategy is the establishment of appropriate Legal Instruments and ratification of existing Agreements, including the Caribbean Arrest Warrant Treaty. To this end, Persad-Bissessar said requests will be made to attorneys general and ministers of national security to meet as a matter of urgency, with a view to putting this framework in place – particularly with respect to the Caricom Maritime and Airspace Security Cooperation Agreement and the Caricom Arrest Warrant Treaty.

At the 29th Inter-Sessional Meeting of CARICOM Heads of Government, in Port-au-Prince, Haiti in February 2018, the Bahamas and Barbados signed the arrest warrant treaty, bringing the total number of signatories up to 10 (Suriname, Trinidad & Tobago, Antigua & Barbadua, St. Kitts & Nevis, St. Lucia, Guyana, Dominica, Grenada, Barbados and the Bahamas).

At the 39th Regular Meeting of CARICOM Heads of Government, in Montego Bay, Jamaica in July 2018, Jamaica signed the arrest warrant treaty, bringing the total number of signatories to 11.

The total number of signatories was then brought up to at least 12 when Trinidad and Tobago signed the arrest warrant treaty at a special summit on the CSME in early December 2018, held in Trinidad and Tobago.

== CARICOM rapid exchange system for dangerous non-food consumer goods (CARREX) ==
In 2012 CARICOM launched an online consumer-protection warning system which allows 13 million consumers in 14 member states to alert authorities on dangerous products which they detect in the market.

It is called the CARICOM rapid exchange system for dangerous non-food consumer goods, (CARREX) and was developed in response to concerns voiced by consumer bodies of the need to strengthen the Region's market surveillance for unsafe consumer goods. The concerns stemmed from the perceived increased permeability of the regional market to unsafe consumer products, which were facing growing difficulties in entering neighbouring territories where market surveillance systems were more effective. Such perceptions are supported by the fact that most industrialized countries do not have limitations in their law on the re-exportation of dangerous goods outside their frontiers once these have been identified at their borders.

Mindful of the resource limitations of Member governments in establishing and operating adequate market surveillance systems, it was recognised that the system could also aid in preventing the importation of dangerous goods by stopping such imports at the borders, once they have been detected elsewhere in the Community. The involvement of customs departments will therefore be critical in this regard and incorporates an added feature which is now being integrated in the EU's RAPEX from which the CARREX stems.

National contact points have been created in Antigua and Barbuda, Barbados, Belize, Dominica, Grenada, Guyana, Haiti, Jamaica, Montserrat, St. Kitts and Nevis, St. Lucia, St. Vincent and the Grenadines, Suriname, Trinidad and Tobago, who are all participating in this regional system. The notification system covers non-food consumer products such as motor vehicles, electrical items, toys, pharmaceutical products and a range of others which more than 13 million consumers in these countries use annually.

CARREX operates through an online portal/webpage (http://carrex.caricom.org/) that allows consumers in any of the participating countries to alert their national contact point about a product, which they have detected, has caused harm or poses a safety hazard. Under the system, non-food and pharmaceutical products can be withdrawn from Caricom markets and action taken to ensure that regional and international manufacturers address consumer safety concerns.

On the website, consumers and consumer organisations are advised that the information they supply will be treated as confidential and used only to process their report, enforce national laws or CARICOM treaty provisions or identify areas for improving laws and regulations currently in force.

Arising from a predecessor project which prepared, inter alia, a product safety policy, the recommendation to craft a rapid alert system for dangerous non-food items was made and adopted in July 2010 at a meeting of consumer representatives convened by the CARICOM Secretariat. CARREX was officially launched following decisions by the Council for Trade and Economic Development (COTED) in May and November 2011. At the November 2011 meeting it was mandated that operation of this regional system commence on 1 January 2012. The system was officially operationalized on 3 January 2012. Leading up to its launch, 12 persons from participating countries’ national contact points were trained on the use of a secure system, which allows them to transmit notifications to each other through a regional secretariat located at the CARICOM Secretariat's CSME Unit in Barbados.

CARREX is expected to be completely operational at the national and regional levels by the end of 2014. From 3 to 5 December 2014, representatives from national standards bureaux in CARICOM were trained at a Regional Workshop in Suriname on matters relating to the CARREX and consumer product safety. The workshop was facilitated by the CARICOM Secretariat in collaboration with the Organisation of American States (OAS). Participants focused on the study of risk assessment concepts and methods in order to enhance national interagency networking in creating and sharing information. There were sessions aimed at strengthening national capacities to detect unsafe products and to take timely measures to tackle the circulation of such products.

The training will enable CARICOM Member States to more effectively implement the CARREX system and market surveillance processes for non-food consumer goods. The intervention was funded with assistance under the Tenth European Development Fund (10th EDF) CARICOM Single Market and Economy (CSME) and Economic Integration Programme (EIP).

== Elimination of roaming charges ==
At the opening ceremony of the Caribbean Telecommunications Union (CTU) Caribbean Ministerial Forum on ICT in Port-of-Spain on 7 August 2013 it was announced by CTU President Phillip Paulwell that Digicel has agreed to abolish roaming charges for users of the company's networks when they travel in the region from 1 October.

“After some negotiation, Digicel has agreed as of October 1, 2013, on the abolition of voice roaming on Digicel's network in Caricom countries. Each travelling subscriber will be treated as if he is using his local/domestic Digicel network throughout the region and therefore will be billed accordingly," said Paulwell, who is also Jamaica's Minister of Science, Technology, Energy and Mining. Paulwell said negotiations would continue with Digicel for the abolition of roaming on data charges by year-end and for the removal of taxes on international calls in Jamaica and Haiti. Discussions with LIME, the region's other major telecoms provider, on a plan for LIME to eliminate roaming charges were ongoing, said Paulwell.

“The overall aim is to abolish roaming for both voice and data, and the objective is to achieve this by year end. Those charges hinder affordable communication between Caribbean people, and as we move toward greater regional unity, we must take every opportunity to remove the barrier that keep us apart," said Paulwell.

== Single ICT space ==
The initiative of a single ICT space for CARICOM was first mooted at the tenth meeting of the CARICOM Heads of Government in 1989. Further calls for a single ICT space were made by Grenada's Prime Minister, Dr. Keith Mitchell at the opening ceremony of the 34th Heads of Government meeting on 3 July 2013. In making the address, Dr. Mitchell stated that CARICOM members "need to figure out how to leverage ICT as a platform for regional development" and that "the key recommendation of the Regional Digital Development Strategy is that we seek to transform ourselves from 15 sovereign states to a Single ICT Space."

The Single ICT space initiative will aim to complement the flagship regional programme, the CARICOM Single Market and economy (CSME).

Suggested characteristics of the Single ICT Space include: consistent rules across the Region, a single mobile numbering plan and consequent removal of roaming charges for intra-regional calls (already partially achieved with regards to all Digicel calls across the region), and CARICOM Copyrights which could foster renewed entrepreneurship and innovation.

Considerable benefits are expected to be realised if a single ICT space can be established. In addition to improved economies of scale and scope, a single ICT space can lead to a more coherent approach in addressing a broad range of ICT-related issues in the region, which is urgently needed. More importantly, if done correctly, increased competitiveness and growth in the individual countries and the region as a whole could also eventuate.

At the conclusion of the 34th meeting of the CARICOM Heads of Government, the Heads of Government agreed that ICT issues would receive focused attention at the 25th Inter-Sessional Meeting of the Conference in 2014 to be held in St. Vincent and the Grenadines in the first quarter of the year.

In that regard they mandated that the Council for Trade and Economic Development (COTED) ICT meet urgently under the Chairmanship of the Lead Head of Government with responsibility for ICT to consider the ICT Action Plan, the proposal for a Single CARICOM ICT Space and other relevant ICT issues and make recommendations to the 25th Inter-Sessional Meeting.

At the 25th Inter-Sessional Meeting of the Conference in St. Vincent and the Grenadines, held in early March 2014, Dr. the Hon. Ralph Gonsalves, Prime Minister of St. Vincent and the Grenadines, said Tuesday evening that a Roadmap towards unveiling the Single Information Communication Technology ICT Space as the digital layer of the CARICOM Single Market and Economy (CSME) over the next two years would be developed and presented to the Heads of Government Meeting in July 2015. Dr. Gonsalves, said that the Roadmap would include elements such as spectrum management, bringing technology to the people and transforming them to digital citizens, diaspora re-engagement, cyber security and public-private partnerships.

The Community's efforts to boost development through the use of (ICT) would be undertaken in tandem with the Reform Process for the years 2014–2019, Dr. Gonsalves said at the conclusion of the 25th Intersessional Meeting. Developing a Single CARICOM ICT Space to enhance the environment for investment and production was identified as one of the key areas that the Community should undertake in the short-term to become competitive. As envisioned by its framers, the Single ICT Space will encompass the management of Regional information, human resources, legislation and infrastructure in the sector to elicit maximum benefit for the Region's populace.

The Single ICT space and the Region's Digital Agenda 2025 will be constructed on the foundation of the Regional Digital Development Strategy (RDDS) which was approved in 2013, and will also have inputs from the Commission on the Economy and the Post-2015 Agenda.

== Functional cooperation among regional airlines ==
Following a special meeting of the Council for Trade and Economic Development (COTED) on Transportation in May 2013, under the Chairmanship of Dr. the Hon. Ralph Gonsalves, Prime Minister of St. Vincent and the Grenadines and Lead Head of Government for Transport in CARICOM, the Conference of Heads of Government of CARICOM established the Transportation Commission in September 2013. The commission was intended to address the ongoing concerns of the travelling public and the critical role transportation plays in the Community. In approving the Terms of Reference for the commission, the Bureau of Heads of Government endorsed a proposal from the Ministers of Transport that it would be in the best interest of the Region for the government-owned carriers in CARICOM – CAL, LIAT, Surinam Airways, and Bahamasair – to collaborate on ways to provide a more efficient, reliable and affordable service to the Region.

Discussions among the regional government-owned airlines began on 23 January 2014, under the auspices of the CARICOM Secretariat. The interaction of air carriers in January identified the procurement of equipment, training of personnel, scheduling of flights, and maintenance of aircraft, as some of the areas where cooperation was possible. The meeting agreed that while CAL and LIAT collaborated at the technical level, interaction at the corporate level would prove useful in cementing and increasing collaboration and improving efficiencies. To this end, the acting CEOs of the two airlines met on 31 January and advanced concrete ways of collaboration in the areas identified.

A second meeting was held in February 2014 and preceded inaugural deliberations of the Transportation Commission (which were held later on that day). During this second meeting, the airline representatives including CEOs, chairmen of the board and chief financial officers, put more flesh to the earlier discussions and sought to pursue further deliberations on matters including training, ground handling and arrangements for smoother transiting by the travelling public. The acting CEOs of CAL and LIAT also shared the outcomes of their discussions on 31 January with their colleagues at this second meeting

== Support funds ==
To support the establishment and functioning of the CSME, there are three support funds that have been established. One is the Community level CARICOM Development Fund established in August 2009 under Article 158 of the Revised Treaty of Chaguaramas "for the purpose of providing financial or technical assistance to disadvantaged countries, regions and sectors." Initially capitalized at US$79.9 million by the end of 2012 the Fund had a total of US$107 million in funds available for financial and technical assistance support. All 12 Members of the CSME contributing to the CDF are eligible to receive assistance from the Fund, however only the designated disadvantaged countries – the LDCs (OECS and Belize) and Guyana (as a Highly Indebted Poor Country) will have access to resources during the first contribution cycle from 2008 to 2014.

The other two funds have been established at the national level, by Trinidad and Tobago and are available for all CSME countries. These are the CARICOM Trade Support (CTS) Programme and CARICOM Petroleum Stabilisation Fund. The CTS Programme provides interest-free loans to finance business development projects in order to help CARICOM States improve their trade capacity and enhance the performance of their individual economies and to strengthen the competitiveness among private sector firms. The CTS Programme was launched in 2004 with a revolving fund loan in the amount of TT$100 million. The Petroleum Stabilization Fund (PSF) was officially launched in 2006, but had de facto been in operation since 2004. The PSF is a grant facility capitalized at a maximum of TT$25 million per month (or TT$300 million per year) based on a CARICOM partner country's purchase of petroleum from Petrotrin. It is aimed at supporting poverty eradication projects and is administered by the Caribbean Development Bank.

In January 2015, at the first First Caribbean Energy Security Summit in Washington, DC, Trinidad and Tobago's Prime Minister Kamla Persad-Bissessar proposed a US$1 billion Caribbean Energy Thematic Fund. Persad-Bissessar note that after 18 months of rigour analysis and feasibility studies in close coordination with the Inter-American Development Bank (IDB), her government had agreed on the creation of this fund for Caricom member states to build resilience, competitiveness and energy security via transformation of the energy landscape in the region. This transformation would be brought about by (i) maximizing the use of renewable energy sources; (ii) Improving energy efficiency and conservation; and (iii) converting the base load capacity of the region towards Liquefied Natural Gas-fueled electricity generation. The proposed fund would be capitalized and administered in conjunction with the Inter-American Development Bank (IADB), the Caribbean Development Bank (CDB), the World Bank, IMF, other international donors, and the private sector. Later in February 2015, T&T's Minister of Planning and Development Dr Bhoe Tewarie, clarified that Trinidad & Tobago would only be participating in the proposed fund if it makes sense to do so and if there was going to be return on the investment into region's long term energy security and needs. He added that the level of Trinidad and Tobago's participation would also depend on the willingness and commitment of the Inter-American Development Bank and other contributing donors. He noted that the proposal was well received by other Caricom representatives at the First Caribbean Energy Security Summit in Washington, DC and that his government was committed to establishing the fund.

== Customs unification and harmonization ==
Established as a common market and customs union to replace the previous Caribbean Free Trade Area, Caricom has been working towards customs unification and harmonization since its foundations in 1973. The original Common External Tariff (CET) agreement became effective in 1973 but even up to the mid-1980s it had not been completely implemented in all member states. A new CET was agreed in 1992, to be implemented in phases until fully implemented by 1 January 1998. Special consideration was given to the less developed countries (LDCs) in this regard. Between 2000 and 2004, only 3 member states which were party to the CET Agreement, Antigua and Barbuda, Montserrat and St. Kitts and Nevis, were yet to complete the process. Montserrat fully implemented the CET in July 2004 Antigua & Barbuda and St. Kitts & Nevis had begun full implementation of the fourth and final phase of the CET implementation by October 2004.

In 2003 the Caricom Secretariat first commissioned the drafting of model legislation for the harmonisation of customs legislation in Caricom. It was intended that the model bill would incorporate all the best practices of international customs administrations while also establishing predictability, trade facilitation and transparency as the regional norm. Discussions were held with local stakeholders, with the feedback being directly fed into the drafting of the harmonized bill and later harmonized customs regulations and a guide to best practices.

The first draft of the model Customs bill was introduced in 2008 and underwent a number of changes to produce the current draft Model Customs Bill which was finally agreed to by the Caricom states in August 2014. With the Bill now completed, the Secretariat, with the continued assistance of the Caribbean Regional Technical Assistance Centre (CARTAC)and the support of the consultancy firm ACP Business Climate Facility (BizClim) proceeded to set about with the drafting of Customs Regulations and Customs Brokers Regulations to accompany the bill. The harmonized customs regulations and best practices guide were completed and submitted to the Secretariat in January 2015 and thereafter circulated among the CSME member states.

Two joint meetings of the Comptrollers of Customs and the Chief Parliamentary Counsels of the Caricom countries involved will be held in February 2015 (in Antigua & Barbuda) and March 2015 (in Trinidad & Tobago) to discuss the draft regulations. If the regulations are agreed upon this will result in significant changes to customs procedures of the Caricom countries. The first meeting in February 2015 was successful, with consensus and sign-off on the harmonized customs regulations expected for the next meeting in March. If finally agreed upon then, the harmonized customs laws will be forwards for approval by the relevant Caricom bodies and then adopted for implementation by each member state.

Once fully implemented the harmonized customs law and regulations are expected to provide benefits such as increased attractiveness of Caricom as a destination for foreign direct investment, increased predictability of customs procedures at ports of entry, reduced clearance times for goods and greater support for regional companies as they expand their operations in keeping with their right of establishment under the CSME.

== Past projects ==
=== Special visa and the single domestic space in 2006–07 ===
During the July 2006 CARICOM Summit, the various leaders reached an agreement on measures to ensure hassle-free movement for visitors to the 2007 Cricket World Cup, as well intelligence sharing and cooperation for the security of the event. People were originally to be able to travel amongst the nine host countries and Dominica between 15 January 2007 and 15 May 2007 using a single CARICOM visa. However, during a meeting in Trinidad and Tobago on 29 December 2006, the Heads of Government decided to push back the creation of the Single Domestic Space to 1 February 2007 in response to representation from tourism ministers and others involved in the tourism industry.

Cruise ship passengers not staying more than 24 hours at any of the 10 Caribbean countries were issued with a CARICOM day pass. However, those who were staying on cruise ships, dubbed "floating hotels" for the duration of the games, were required to obtain a visa unless their countries fell within those that are exempted. Visa abolition agreements between some of the ten Caribbean states concerned and countries whose citizens were then required to obtain CARICOM visas during the Cricket World Cup provided for the suspension of the visa-free policy in such cases.

During the three and a half-month period from February to May, the ten Caribbean countries became a "single domestic space" in which travellers only had their passport stamped and had to submit completed entry and departure forms at the first port and country of entry. The entry and departure forms were also standardised for all ten countries. When continuing travel throughout the Single Domestic Space, persons (including those using the common visa) were not required to have their documents processed to clear customs and immigration and did not need to have their passports stamped, but still needed to travel with them. Once passengers arrived at the Immigration Department Desk at the first port of entry, they were provided with a blue CARICOM wristband that identified them for hassle free movement through the single domestic space.

When the single domestic space came to an end on 15 May 2007 nearly 45,000 visas had been issued.

In February 2007 the CARICOM Heads of Government agreed to set up a Task Force to recommend a revised CARICOM Special Visa for the future, making any changes necessary from the experiences of the 3-month Single Domestic Space.

==== Proposed reintroduction ====
In February 2013, the Caribbean Tourism Organization (CTO) Aviation Task Force (a committee established to facilitate air transportation into and throughout the Caribbean and to enhance airlift) recommended a review of visa regimes in member countries in order to improve the visitor experience following a recent meeting held in Antigua to review issues affecting intra-regional travel and make recommendations for increasing consumer demand.

The task force also recommended to its membership a system similar to the Europe's Schengen visa programme where visitors who are cleared at the initial port of entry can continue travelling seamlessly throughout most of the European Union.

The task force agreed that full clearance at the first port of entry was necessary to ensure an improved cross regional experience by visitors and agreed that the sub-regional grouping, the Organization of Eastern Caribbean States, (OECS) should be used as a model for such a single visa regime. The OECS is in the process of establishing a single economic space and is expected to implement full clearance at the first point of entry into the sub-group. The CTO Aviation Task Force agreed that this best practice would be reviewed after its implementation for possible replication across the Caribbean Community (CARICOM) region and beyond.

In addition to a single visa regime, the Task Force recommended a standardized entry and exit card– otherwise called immigration or ED card – across the Caribbean. This it is said, would help reduce airlines' costs and improve customer service at Caribbean airports. Again, the OECS, which is expected to introduce the use of one common ED card, will be used as a model.

Other recommendations include an analysis of the impact of taxes and fees on the cost of regional air travel and a more holistic approach towards air travel revenue; including a possible ticket tax rebate when a traveller starts and ends the journey in another destination of the same domestic space. The task force also identified an urgent need to end secondary screening for intra-regional passengers who are in transit since the current practice diminishes the overall travellers' experience.

Also on the Aviation Task Force agenda were issues related to the CARICOM Multilateral Air Services Agreement, open skies, and other regulations and restrictions facing airlines serving the Caribbean.

In June 2013, ministers of transport for CARICOM member states recommended the reintroduction of the single domestic space. The ministers made the recommendation following a special meeting of the Council for Trade and Economic Development (COTED) on Transportation held in St. Vincent and the Grenadines on Wednesday 29 May 2013. Recommendations from that meeting will be presented to the CARICOM heads of government at the upcoming 34th regular meeting to be held in Trinidad and Tobago from 4–6 July, at which transportation will receive special attention. It was also agreed that the conference of heads of government should be asked to revisit its decision to discontinue the inexpensive armband system that facilitated hassle free regional travel during the 2007 Cricket World Cup, particularly given the popularity of the initiative with the citizens of the Community.

Also recognized at the COTED meeting were the challenges faced with respect to frequent security checks during intra-regional travel and cooperation between the regional airlines. These challenges were acknowledged as negatively affecting the travelling public and having repercussions for business and tourism and it was agreed that work had to be done to improve customer service among border control officers in the region. With respect to issue of air transportation, the ministers underscored the need for deeper collaboration among the regional airlines so that their operations could be better streamlined. Key among the recommendations were for shareholders in the government-owned carriers in CARICOM, beginning with Caribbean Airlines (CAL), LIAT and Surinam Airways, to meet in the near future, to discuss how they may rationalise their operations, routes, flight schedules and luggage transfers among other things in the best interests of the consumers. A team was established in the meeting, chaired by St. Vincent and the Grenadines, to review elements of a draft policy on air and maritime transportation and asked member states to submit comments by the end of June.

Up to one year prior, at a February 2012 meeting with a CARCOM Bureau of Heads of Government delegation, Haitian President Michel Martelly had asked fellow Caribbean Community (CARICOM) leaders to consider a plan that would allow Haitians who hold a United States or Schegen visas to travel hassle-free through CARICOM. Martelly had made clear that his interest was in Haitians enjoying the same privileges as other CARICOM member states, and that the visa plan could be the first step in that process.

At the December 2018 special summit on the CSME in Trinidad and Tobago, the Heads of Government agreed to work towards having a single security check for direct transit passengers on multi-stop flights within the Community and to examine the reintroduction of a single domestic space for travellers.

=== CARICOM traveller's cheques facility (1980–93) ===
The original Treaty of Chaguaramas had prescribed that member states explore ways of harmonizing their monetary, exchange rate and payments policies in the interest of smooth functioning of the Common Market. Up to the late 1970s the various CARICOM countries established a compensation procedure to favour the use of the member states currencies. The procedure was aimed at ensuring monetary stability and promoting trade development. This monetary compensation scheme (or Intra-Regional Payments Scheme) was at first bilateral, but although it worked fairly well for about eight years it was limited, cumbersome and unwieldy as each participant had to keep individual accounts for all the other participants and the accounts had to be individually balanced at the end of each credit period. In addition, the bilateral arrangements did not produce meaningful economies in the use of foreign exchange. The system finally became multilateral in 1977 and was called the CARICOM Multilateral Clearing Facility (CMCF). The CMCF was supposed to favour the use of internal CARICOM currencies for transaction settlement and to promote banking cooperation and monetary cooperation between member states. Each country was allowed a fixed credit line and initially the CMCF was successful enough that both the total credit line and the credit period were extended by 1982. With the CMCF in place, intraregional trade doubled between 1978 and 1981, and the use of the credit facility of the CMCF expanded from US$40 million to US$100 million. However, the CMCF failed shortly thereafter in the early 1980s due to Guyana's inability to settle its debts and Barbados being unable to grant new payment terms

In the period since suspension, the only activities which took place under the aegis of the CMCF were the rescheduling the obligations of the debtor (in the case of the CMCF, there was only one major debtor owing in excess of US$160 million to the Facility) and the activities of the Caricom Travellers Cheques (CTC) Facility. The Caricom Traveller's Cheques Facility was introduced on 1 August 1980 and authorised dealers were allowed to issue only Caricom traveller's cheques to residents travelling within Caricom countries other than Jamaica. Jamaica later fully joined the scheme in the mid-1980s and the cheques were issued in Trinidad and Tobago dollars in denominations of 10, 20, 50, and 100. The Traveller's Cheques facility was administered by the National Commercial Bank of Trinidad and Tobago and usage had fluctuated in the 1980s but between 1986 and 1991 it had average annual sales and encashment levels in excess of US$3 million. Following the removal of exchange control in most territories towards the end of the 1980s, the devaluation of the Trinidad & Tobago dollar and the introduction of floating exchange rates in Guyana (1987), Jamaica (1991) and Trinidad & Tobago (April 1993) the annual average sales and encashment levels for the CTC facility first showed a marked decline to under US$1.6 million in 1991 and then under US$1 million in 1992. The Caricom Traveller's Cheques Facility was officially ended in December 1993 with cheques issued before 31 December 1993 able to be cashed for a period of one year at commercial banks and thereafter only at the Central Bank of Trinidad and Tobago.

== Future proposals ==
- Airline amalgamation
- Civil Society Charter
- Currency Union
- Freedom of Movement
- Political Union(s)
- Regionalised Stock Exchange
- Reintroduction of a Single Tourist Visa
- Reintroduction of a Single Domestic Space
- Regional Public Procurement System
- Caribbean Space Agency (NASA cooperation with Caribbean Community)

== Free trade ==
From around the year 2000, the Caribbean Community (CARICOM) states have placed a new focus and emphasis on establishing Free Trade Agreements (FTAs) with local and international trading partners. In the past this was done in collaboration with the Caribbean Regional Negotiating Machinery (CRNM), however in 2009 the CARICOM Heads of Government have voted for the CRNM to be moved to the Caribbean Community organisation where it would become renamed the CARICOM Office of Trade Negotiations (OTN) similar to the OCTA of the Pacific Islands Forum.

Note that the Economic Partnership Agreement (EPA) with the EU involves all the CARICOM Member States (except Montserrat, which is not independent) plus the Dominican Republic grouped under the Caribbean Forum or CARIFORUM sub-grouping of the ACP countries. At the end of the negotiations to establish the EPA (begun in 2002 and scheduled to end in 2007) and with the signing of the Agreement in October 2008 there will be a new Free Trade Agreement that will replace the Lomé system of preferential access to the European market for the ACP from 2008.

CARICOM itself superseded the Caribbean Free Trade Association, which established a free trade agreement at the time among all of the current CARICOM members except Haiti, Suriname and The Bahamas. With Suriname and Haiti's accessions to CARICOM in 1995 and 2002 respectively all CARICOM members, except The Bahamas, currently engage in free trade with each other under the terms of the old Common Market Annex to the Treaty of Chaguaramas or under the terms of the Revised Treaty of Chaguaramas that establishes the CARICOM Single Market. The EPA negotiated with the EU contains a regional preference clause (Article 238 of the Agreement) which strengthens Caribbean integration and ensures that trade liberalization commitments granted to the EU and its member states by any CARIFORUM state is also extended to by that state to all other CARIFORUM states. As a result, CARIFORUM countries are required to give the same or more favourable treatment concerning trade in goods and services to each other as they give to the EU and its member states and that this treatment shall apply immediately for products that have a zero rate of duty. The Regional Preference Clause also requires that the More Developed Countries of CARICOM (The Bahamas, Barbados, Jamaica, Guyana, Suriname and Trinidad & Tobago), together with the Dominican Republic should apply such treatment one year after the signature of the Agreement in relation to all other products and services specified in the Agreement. The Less Developed Countries of CARICOM (Antigua & Barbuda, Belize, Dominica, Grenada, St Lucia, St. Kitts and Nevis, and St. Vincent and the Grenadines) are not required to extend such treatment to the Dominican Republic and vice versa until two years after the signature of the Agreement, while Haiti is not required to extend such favourable treatment to the Dominican Republic before five years after the Agreement has been signed.

The Regional Preference Clause as well as other aspects of the EPA have the potential to deepen Caribbean integration by allowing for the duty free circulation of EU-originating goods in CARIFORUM (which will depend on the establishment of a CARIFORUM free-circulation regime) and facilitating greater economic integration between Haiti and the Dominican Republic and between The Bahamas and the rest of CARICOM. The EPA will not lead The Bahamas immediately adopting CARICOM's Common External Tariff, but greater trade flows between The Bahamas and the rest of CARICOM as a result of the extension of the free trade arrangements envisioned under the EPA may eventually make full CSME membership more attractive for The Bahamas.

In March 2013, The Bahamian Minister of Financial Services, Ryan Pinder, strongly advocated for regional trade integration and increased exports collectively for the region through production based on value-added/value-chain trade and using Article 238 of the EPA on Regional Preferences as a foundation for this model of integration. He also noted the Government of The Bahamas' readiness to implement the EPA fully, in particular the regional preference clause and that it is of the view that The Bahamas has taken a monumental step towards economic integration when it acceded to the EPA.

The Regional Preference Clause also allows CARIFORUM states and their EU counterparts to apply more favourable treatment to other states within their respective regional integration processes than they would extend to the parties to the Agreement from outside their region. This allows for CARICOM and the Dominican Republic to enhance their Free Trade Agreement to enable more trade benefits to each other without such provisions automatically extending to the EU. The Regional Preference Clause as a result preserves the CARICOM-Dominican Republic Free Trade Agreement, and by possibly fostering enhanced trade between CARICOM and the Dominican Republic, encourages the utilization of that Free Trade Agreement to implement the provisions of the Regional Preference Clause.

While the CARIFORUM-EU Economic Partnership Agreement's Regional Preference Clause extends and applies the free trade provisions between the EU and CARIFORUM states to the CARIFORUM grouping itself, most of the countries in this grouping were already covered in a free trade area created by the CARICOM-Dominican Republic Free Trade Agreement of 2001. That Agreement establishes a free trade area between the Dominican Republic and the CARICOM Member states of Antigua and Barbuda, Barbados, Belize, Dominica, Grenada, Guyana, Jamaica, Montserrat, St. Kitts and Nevis, Saint Lucia, St. Vincent and the Grenadines, Suriname and Trinidad and Tobago. A result of the CARIFORUM-EU EPA's Regional Preference Clause is that allows for the first formal framework for economic integration between Haiti and the Dominican Republic as Haiti is not a part of the CARICOM-Dominican Republic Free Trade Agreement and there has been no previous free trade agreement between them. Thus all 15 of the current CARICOM member states and the Dominican Republic are now involved in at least one free trade arrangement which covers all 16 countries and territories in one way or another.

Preferential agreements
Negotiating parties	Start day	Start month	Start year
CARICOM	1	January	1993
Venezuela	1	January	1993
CARICOM	1	January	1995
Colombia	1	January	1995

Free Trade Agreements

- CARICOM – Cuba (5 July 2000) – In April 2015 Cuba requested additional preferential access to CARICOM's More Developed Countries' markets and offered duty-free access for a large number of CARICOM products into Cuba in return. At the end of January 2017, Cuba and CARICOM agreed for the expansion of reciprocal duty-free access to their markets. A significant number of items from CARICOM, including fish, manufactured goods, agricultural products and beer have been approved for duty-free entry into the Cuban market, while CARICOM members agreed to duty-free entry for Cuban goods such as pharmaceuticals. A number of Cuban products were also included in the agreement on which each of CARICOM's More Developed Countries would be allowed to determine the level of preference granted to Cuba. The agreement remains a partial scope agreement covering trade in goods, but initial discussions were also held on trade in services and the agreement envisions further expansion towards a full free trade agreement and to that end contains a built-in plan towards adopting double taxation agreements between CARICOM states and Cuba, agreeing on intellectual property rights and the protection and promotion of investment.
- CARICOM – Dominican Republic (December 2001)
- CARICOM – Costa Rica (9 March 2004)
- CARIFORUM – European Union EPA ("Economic Partnership Agreements"): Signed by all member states (less Guyana and Haiti) on 15 October 2008 in Barbados. Guyana later signed on 20 October 2008 in Brussels. (Montserrat is a British Overseas Territory and is thus exempt from needing to conclude this agreement.)

Proposed

- CARICOM – Canada: To be negotiated, after Canada finishes their CAFTA agreement.
- CARICOM – Mercosur: Opened for discussions in May 2005
- CARICOM – United States: Has been tossed around politically in various degrees including the idea of CARICOM seeking to be an entrant into NAFTA, but has not yet taken a firm position.

== Petrocaribe ==
13 of the 15 CARICOM countries have signed in 2005 the Petrocaribe, an oil alliance with Venezuela which permits them to purchase oil on conditions of preferential payment.
