= Caribbean Meteorological Organisation =

Institution of the Caribbean Community

The Caribbean Meteorological Organisation is an institution of the Caribbean Community. It had its headquarters in Port of Spain in Trinidad and Tobago, and is one of the eldest institutions of the Caribbean.

In 1951 the British Caribbean Meteorological Service was established to promote and co-ordinate regional activities in the fields of meteorology and allied sciences, to provide support and advice to governments in dealing with issues of an international nature affecting weather and climate and to represent the regional meteorological community's interests at the international level. With the dissolution of the West Indies Federation in 1962, the Caribbean Meteorological Service (CMS) was formed in 1963. In 1973, the CMS became the Caribbean Meteorological Organisation (CMO) following the independence of several member states.

In 1967 the CMO founded the research institute Caribbean Institute for Meteorology and Hydrology (CIMH), that as well forms a part of the Caribbean Community.

== See also ==
- World Meteorological Organization
