= Caribbean Knowledge and Learning Network =

The Caribbean Knowledge and Learning Network (CKLN) is an inter-governmental agency of the Caribbean Community, CARICOM, responsible for developing and managing a high capacity, broadband fiber optic network called C@ribNET, connecting all CARICOM member states.

The Caribbean Knowledge Learning Network Agency was first proposed in 2002 at a meeting where the 7 Prime Ministers of Eastern Caribbean States and Barbados met with the president of the World Bank. It was established in 2004 as an institution of the CARICOM, under the authority of Article 21 of the Revised Treaty of Chaguaramas.

As of the plans from 2005, E-Link Americas, a Canadian not-for-profit corporation, provides satellite connectivity. The University of the West Indies provides a major role in the connectivity of learning centers.
