= François Joseph Depons =

French traveller and author (1751–1812)

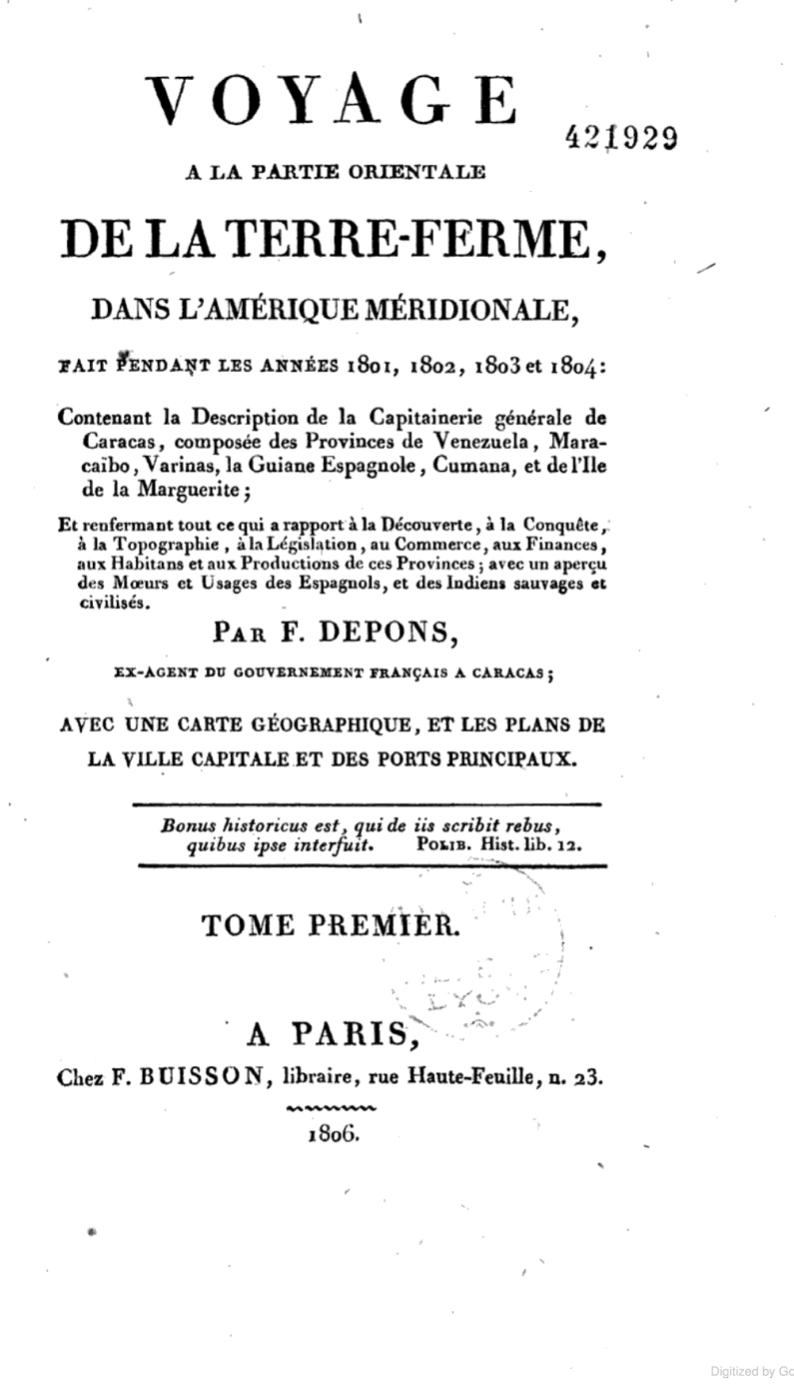
First page of Depons’ book

François Raymond Joseph Depons, sometimes abbreviated as F.J. Depons (1751–1812) was a French government official and author who is most known for his documents and books regarding his travels in South America and the Caribbean.

Born in Soustons, France in 1751, Depons left France and arrived in Saint Domingue (modern day Haiti) around 1790 where he commented on the political situation in a few of his authored works. He resided in Ouanaminthe. However, by 1801, due to the ongoing revolt on the island he moved to Caracas in Venezuela, where he worked as a diplomat and political correspondent. It was in Venezuela where he wrote his most known work entitled, ‘A voyage to the eastern part of Terra Firma, or the Spanish Main, in South-America, during the years 1801, 1802, 1803, and 1804. Containing a description of the territory under the jurisdiction of the captain general of Caraccas, composed of the provinces of Venezuela, Maracaibo, Varinas, Spanish Guiana, Cumana, and the island of Margaretta; and embracing every thing relative to the discovery, conquest, topography, legislation, commerce, finance, inhabitants and productions of the provinces, together with a view of the manners and customs of the Spaniards, and the savage as well as civilized Indians.’ (Originally in French). Depons included maps of Caracas and the ports surrounding the city created by various Cartographers such as Jean-Baptiste Poirson, and Pierre Antoine Tardieu. The book spanned three volumes in total, being completed in 1805 in France. It was then produced in English in 1806 by an American in New York, being published in England around the same time. Depons estimated that the town of Caracas had a population of around 40,000 out of a total 700,000 people in the colony. Depons and another French settler and author called Jean-François Dauxion-Lavaysse noted that the French immigrants to Paria were the “true founders of the town of Güiria”, Güiria being a town with heavy French influence during the time.

In 1807 he produced another book called ‘Perspective on the political and commercial relations of France in the two Indies, under the reigning dynasty.’

Depons spent the rest of his life in France and died in Paris in 1812.

== Works ==
Year	Title	Notes
1790	Observations sur la situation politique de Saint-Domingue	Book
1790	Rapport de MM. le marquis de Cadusch, Brulley & de Pons, nommés commissaires pour l'examen de la déclaration sur interprétation, par M. le gouverneur général de Saint-Domingue.	Document
1791	Recueils de pièces imprimées concernant les débats à l'Assemblée Nationale, mai 1791, colonies, décrets 12 et 15 mai, gens de couleur	Collection of documents
1791	Question des hommes de couleur, libres, ajournée à mercredi prochain 11 mai 1791	Document
1791	Réflexions sur quelques articles du plan de constitution envoyé par l'Assemblée nationale à la colonie de Saint-Domingue	Essay
1791	Les colonies françoises aux sociétés d'agriculture, aux manufactures, et aux fabriques de France	Short 37 page book
1792	La question politique des affranchis et descendans d'affranchis	Essay
1800	Résultats de la cession de la partie espagnole de Saint-Domingue, faite a la France par le Traité de Bale	Document
1806	Voyage à la partie orientale de la Terre-Ferme, dans l'Amérique méridionale, fait pendant les années 1801, 1802, 1803 et 1804	Book
1807	Perspective des rapports politiques et commerciaux de la France dans les deux Indes, sous la dynastie régnante	Book
