= Caribbean Initiative =

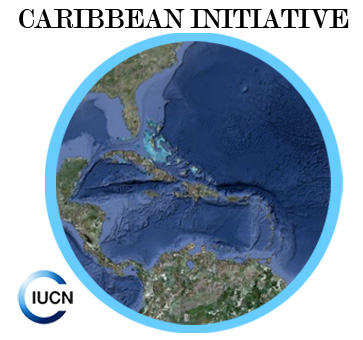

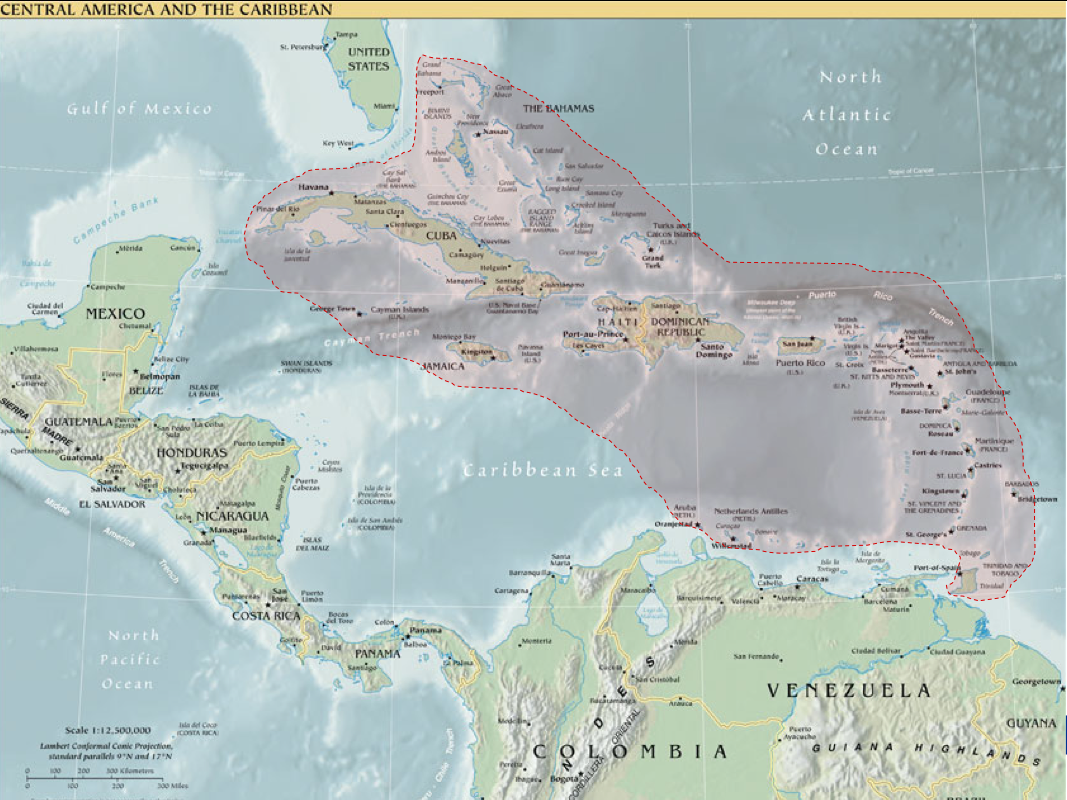

The Caribbean Initiative is an initiative of the IUCN (International Union for the Conservation of Nature). It focuses on the Insular Caribbean - an ecologically coherent unit with unique biodiversity where conservation and natural resource management issues are at the heart of the challenge of sustainable development. The Insular Caribbean consists of three distinct groups of islands: The Bahamas; the Greater Antilles, consisting of the larger islands of Cuba, Dominican Republic, Haiti, Jamaica, and Puerto Rico; and the Lesser Antilles.

== History ==
Members, councillors, commissions and staff of the IUCN assemble every four years at the World Conservation Congress where the four-year global program for conservation and sustainable development is established and approved. This determines the global program priorities and actions of the Union. During the 2004 Congress, the members of the Union requested the Secretariat to reinforce IUCN's presence in the Caribbean region. In response, the IUCN formulated a proposition for the Caribbean Initiative. The Initiative benefited from extensive consultations and an evaluation of fundamental themes, needs and opportunities in the wider Caribbean, and between members and key partners. The development of the Initiative was completed with the support of the French Ministry of Ecology, Energy and Sustainable Development and the Italian Ministry of Foreign Affairs.

The 2009-2012 Caribbean Initiative Strategy was developed, supported and recognized by the members and experts at the October 2008 World Conservation Congress held in Barcelona, Spain. This was also the date of the official launch of the Initiative. Through the Caribbean Initiative, the IUCN aims at strengthening its work in the region and establishing a win-win situation for members and countries. The Initiative offers social and political actors the possibility of sharing a coherent program from the local to global levels that encourages joint and participatory actions.

== Headquarters ==
For an initial period of two years, while the Initiative becomes fully established, IUCN Caribbean has been placed under the responsibility of the Regional Office for Mesoamerica, based in Costa Rica, to allow for administrative and management support as well as the development of links within the wider Caribbean region.

The current Coordinator of the Caribbean Initiative is Ms. Deirdre P. Shurland who is native of Trinidad and Tobago.

== Members of the Caribbean Initiative ==
The current members of the Caribbean Initiative are :

Bahamas
Bahamas National Trust

Cuba
Ministerio de Ciencia, Tecnología y Medio Ambiente (CITMA)
Fundación Antonio Núñez Jiménez de la Naturaleza y el Hombre
Sociedad Cubana para la Protección del Medio Ambiente

Dominican Republic
Secretaría de Estado de Medio Ambiente y Recursos Naturales
Centro para la Conservación y Ecodesarrollo de la Bahía de Samana y su Entorno (CEBSE)
Consorcio Ambiental Dominicano (CAD)
Fundación para el Mejoramiento Humano-PROGRESSIO
Grupo Jaragua

Haïti
Fondation pour la Protection de la Biodiversité Marine (FoProBiM)

Jamaica
National Environment and Planning Agency (NEPA)
Environmental Foundation of Jamaica (EFJ)
Jamaica Conservation and Development Trust (JCDT)
Negril Area Environmental Protection Trust (NEPT)
Negril Chamber of Commerce (NCC)

Netherlands Antilles
National Parks Foundation of the Netherlands Antilles (STINAPA)

St. Kitts and Nevis
Nevis Department of Physical Planning, Natural Resources and Environment

Saint Lucia
Saint Lucia National Trust

Trinidad and Tobago
Caribbean Natural Resources Institute (CANARI)
The Trust for Sustainable Livelihoods (SUSTRUST)
