= Caribbean Institute for Meteorology and Hydrology =

Meteorological institute of the Caribbean Community

The Caribbean Institute for Meteorology and Hydrology was established in 1967 by the member states, all current and ex-British colonies, of the Caribbean Meteorological Organisation (CMO). It was amalgamated with the Caribbean Operational Hydrological Institute (COHI) in the mid-1980s to form the Caribbean Institute for Meteorology and Hydrology (CIMH), but the name was only officially changed in September 1999 to reflect the dual role of the institute. Responsibility for the operation of the institute, which is located in Barbados, rests with the sixteen Commonwealth governments which comprise the CMO.

== History ==
In 1951 the British Caribbean Meteorological Service was established to promote and co-ordinate regional activities in the fields of meteorology and allied sciences, to provide support and advice to governments in dealing with issues of an international nature affecting weather and climate, and to represent the regional meteorological community's interests at the international level. With the dissolution of the West Indies Federation in 1962, the Caribbean Meteorological Service (CMS) was formed in 1963. In 1973, the CMS became the Caribbean Meteorological Organisation (CMO) following the independence of several member states.

== Memberships ==
The CIMH consists of 16 current or former British colonies in the Caribbean region:

- Anguilla
- Antigua and Barbuda
- Barbados
- Belize
- British Virgin Islands
- Cayman Islands
- Dominica
- Grenada
- Guyana
- Jamaica
- Montserrat
- Saint Kitts and Nevis
- Saint Lucia
- Saint Vincent and the Grenadines
- Trinidad and Tobago
- Turks and Caicos Islands

== Function ==
The CIMH, originally the Caribbean Meteorological Institute, provides training for the region's weather observers and technicians, weather forecasters, and specialists in hydrology, agrometeorology, and other related disciplines.

The CIMH provides training to the Bachelor of Science degree in Meteorology in cooperation with the University of the West Indies at Cave Hill.

The CIMH also serves as the CMO's research and climate centre, as well as the regional instrument calibration and maintenance centre.

CIMH issues also the Caribbean Precipitation Outlook, a three-month seasonal forecast for the region.
