= Venezuelan French Creole =

Creole Minority language in Venezuela

- Patuá
- (Dialect/offshoot language of Trinidadian French Creole)
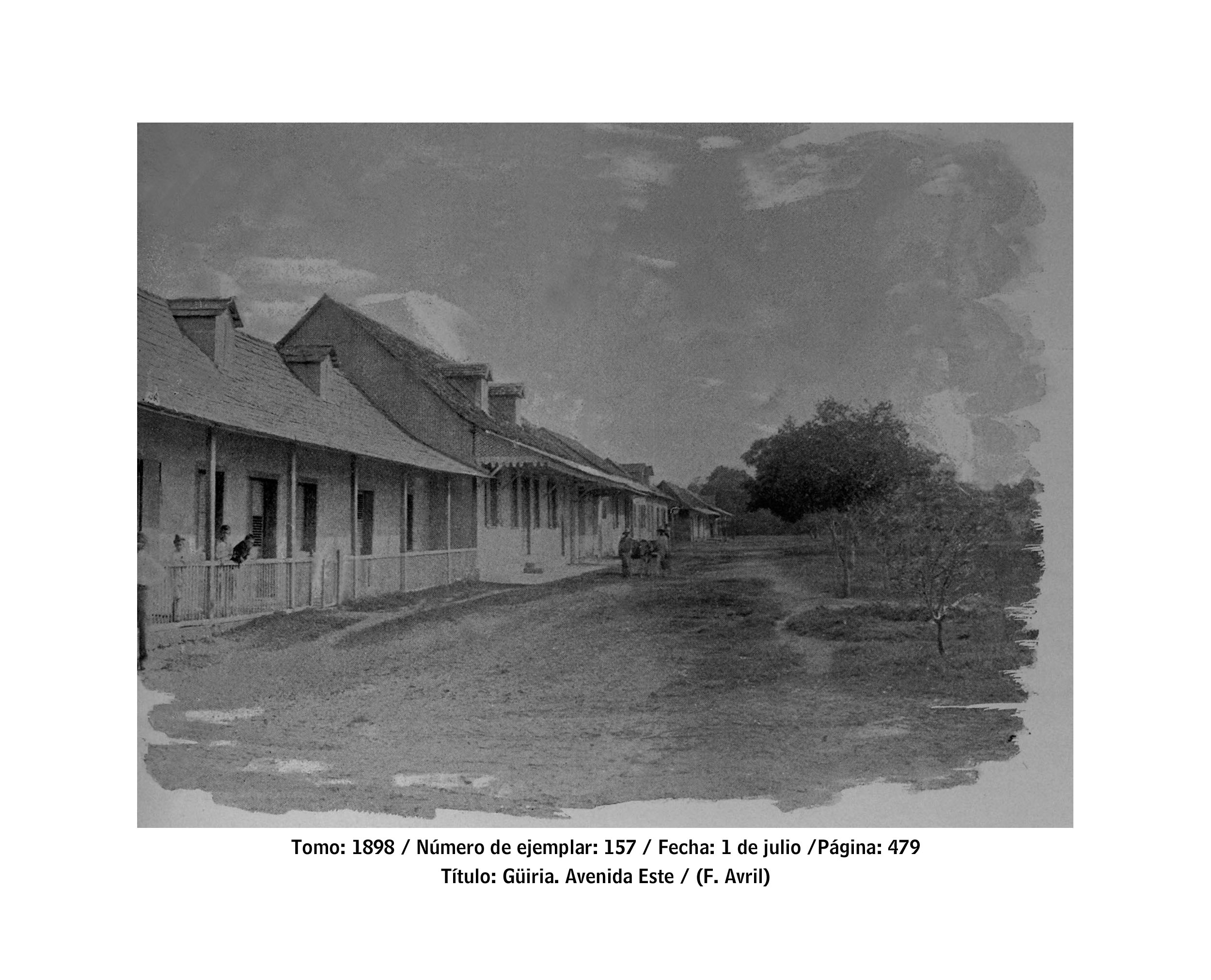
- Photo of Guiria in 1898, the town with the most Creole influence in Venezuela
- Region: Paria Pennisula, Venezuela
- Ethnicity: Afro-Venezuelans (predominantly Afro-Trinidadians)
- Native speakers: 100 (2009)
- Language family: French Creole: Antillean Creole; Trinidadian French Creole; Venezuelan French Creole
- Writing system: Latin

Language codes
- ISO 639-3: –

Venezuelan French Creole (known as Patuá and sometimes abbreviated as VFC) is a branch of Lesser Antillean French Creole spoken in Venezuela. The language is spoken by the descendants of Trinidadian workers and slaves who brought their creole (Trinidadian French Creole) to Venezuela. Venezuelan French Creole is usually considered a dialect or offshoot of Trinidadian French Creole. The language is predominantly spoken on the Paria pennsiula around the town of Güiria, there are also some speakers in El Callao.

== History ==
French and French Creole first arrived in Venezuela during the late 18th century, although contact between the French and Amerindians went back at least a century; there were even reports of the Paria Amerindians speaking French in 1739. After the Cedúla of population in 1783 some French colonists from Trinidad, Tobago and Grenada migrated to Venezuela, bringing the French language and their creole speaking slaves. Many migrated to escape the consequences of the Napoleonic wars as the British had taken the island of Trinidad and Tobago in 1798. The new French immigrants to Paria were said to have been the ‘true founders of Güiria’ according to the authors Jean-François Dauxion-Lavaysse (himself a French settler of the region) and Francois Joseph depons, a French traveler. Revolutionary ideals flourished in Venezuela due to the French Republicans who had been expelled or fled with their slaves from British colonies.

The Venezuelan War of Independence (1810–1823) caused a partial exodus of the French settlers and their creole speaking slaves, however French Creole speakers soon returned. Trinidadian immigrants continually migrated to Venezuela; before emancipation many runaway slaves (Maroons) fled to Venezuela for a better life, and during the Venezuelan Gold Rush in the 1850s and 1860s after emancipation.

The language began to decline in the late 1800s and early 1900s, one of the factors of the decline was the move of the Güiria customs to Macuro by the president, this facilitated the slow decline in trade between Trinidad and Güiria, and caused Creole speakers to disperse across Venezuela. The growth of infrastructure connections between Caracas and other Spanish-speaking towns ended Güiria's dependence on Trinidad, causing Spanish to become an important language. Trinidadian French Creole also began to decline in Trinidad, which contributed to the decline of Venezuelan French Creole.

By 1990 all informants of a study regarding Venezuelan French Creole were over the age of 80, with later generations being unable to speak it fluently.

== Current status ==
Revival attempts have occurred, in 2006 a gathering was held called the ‘Primer Encuentro de Abuelos Creole y/o Patuá Parlantes de Venezuela y El Caribe en homenaje a Jorge Logan Delcine’ (‘First Meeting of Creole grandparents and/or Patois Speakers of Venezuela and the Caribbean, in tribute to Jorge Logan Delcine’) directed by the anthropologist Omaira Gutiérrez Marcano. Efforts were also made to teach the language at the local Universidad de Oriente in Sucre province.

On 19 November 2014, Patuá was recognised as Venezuelan Cultural heritage.

The language, although small is still spoken by small predominantly elder communities in Güiria, El Callao and Delta Amacuro.

== Grammar ==
=== Alphabet and orthography ===
There is no official alphabet or orthography, however attempts have been made to standardise this oral language and a lot of the alphabet and orthography are the same or borrowed from other Creoles, most notably Trinidadian French Creole, which does have an official alphabet. The first proposed orthography (by the Venezuelan scholar Rosa Bosch) uses more Spanish and French inspired forms of the words, for example most other Creoles would write the word ‘class’ as ‘Klas’ whilst the proposed orthography uses ‘Clas’ which the scholar Ferreira notes as being "overrepresentation" of the grapheme ‘c’ (she also mentions the overrepresentation of other graphemes in the proposed orthography).

The Haitian IPN orthography was also proposed as being a plausible orthography to use for Patuá. However at the ‘Primer Encuentro de Abuelos Creole y/o Patuá Parlantes de Venezuela y El Caribe en homenaje a Jorge Logan Delcine’ the participants decided on using a mix of Spanish, old Haitian and Brazilian orthography, below is the most commonly accepted orthography made during the event and compiled by Facendo et al. the first half of the table show consonant sounds and the second part are Vowels, the first half of the vowels section are Oral sounds, and the second half are nasal sounds:

Sound	Orthography	Example in Patuá	English translation
/p/	< p >	Patuá	Patois
/b/	< b >	Bo	Kiss
/t/	< t >	Ti	Small
/d/	< d >	Du	Sweet
/k/	< k >	Kai	House
/g/	< g >	Gato	Cake
/f/	< f >	Fami	Family
/v/	< v >	Vann	To sell
/s/	< s >	Sèl	Salt
/z/	< z >	Zòt	You (pl.)
/ʃ/	< ch >	Cho	Hot
/tʃ/	< tch >	Tchè	Heart
/ʒ/	< j >	Jaden	Garden
/dʒ/	< dj >	Djep (or) Djèp	Wasp
/m/	< m >	Mue	I (or) Me
/n/	< n >	Non	No
/ŋ/	< ng >	Zonng	Fingernail
/j/	< y >	Yo	They
/w/	< w >	Wè	To see
/h/	< h >	Had	Clothes
/i/	< i >	I	He
/e/	< e >	Epi	And (or) With
/ɛ/	< è >	Èvèk	With
/a/	< a >	Apwe	After
/u/	< u >	U	You
/o/	< o >	Oblije	To force
/ɔ/	< ò >	Zòt	You (pl.)
/ɛ̃/	< en >	Pen	Bread
/ã/	< an >	Jan	People
/õ/	< on >	Yonn (or) Nyon	One

== Sample vocabulary ==
Below are some common basic phrases in Venezuelan French Creole;

=== Greetings ===
- Bon suá dam: Good evening Madam
- Cum u yé (or) Kum u ye (or) Kuma u yé (or) Cumauyé: How are you (similar to other creole's Kouman ou Yé")
- Cum u ka santi /kum u ka sãti: How are you feeling
- Mue/mwe bien meci: I am good/fine thank you
- Cum u ka quillé u /kum u ka kwije u: What are you called

=== Learning ===
- La pumié clas: The first class
- Nu vini apuen palé patuá /nu vini apwãn pale patua: We came to learn to speak Patuá
