= Treaty of Chaguaramas =

1973 treaty establishing CARICOM

- Signed: 4 July 1973
- Location: Chaguaramas, Trinidad and Tobago
- Effective: 1 August 1973 (revised in 2001)

The Treaty of Chaguaramas established the Caribbean Community and Common Market, popularly known as CARICOM. It was signed on 4 July 1973 in Chaguaramas, Trinidad and Tobago. It was signed by Barbados, Guyana, Jamaica, and Trinidad and Tobago. It came into effect on 1 August 1973. The treaty established the regional institution while replacing the Caribbean Free Trade Association which ceased to exist on 1 May 1974. The revised treaty, signed in 2001, created the Caribbean Single Market and Economy.

In addition to economic issues, the Community instrument addressed issues of foreign policy coordination and functional cooperation. Issues of economic integration, particularly those related to trade arrangements, were addressed in the CSME Annex.

A revised Treaty of Chaguaramas establishing the Caribbean Community including the CARICOM Single Market and Economy (CSME) was signed in 2001.

== Oath ==
The countries of the region that signed the Treaty of Chaguaramas made an oath to:

- Recall the Declaration of Grand Anse and other decisions of the Conference of Heads of Government, in particular the commitment to deepening regional economic integration through the establishment of the CARICOM Single Market and Economy (CSME) in order to achieve sustained economic development based on international competitiveness, coordinated economic and foreign policies, functional co-operation and enhanced trade and economic relations with third States;
- Recognising that globalisation and liberalisation have important implications for international competitiveness;
- Determined to enhance the effectiveness of the decision-making and implementation processes of the Community;
- Desirous of restructuring the Organs and Institutions of the Caribbean Community and Common Market and redefining their functional relationships so as to enhance the participation of their peoples, and in particular the social partners, in the integration movement;
- Conscious of the need to promote in the Community the highest level of efficiency in the production of goods and services especially with a view to maximizing foreign exchange earnings on the basis of international competitiveness, attaining food security, achieving structural diversification and improving the standard of living of their peoples;
- Aware that optimal production by economic enterprises in the Community requires the structured integration of production in the Region, and particularly, the unrestricted movement of capital, labour and technology;
- Resolved to establish conditions which would facilitate access by their nationals to the collective resources of the Region on a non-discriminatory basis;
- Convinced that market-driven industrial development in the production of goods and services is essential for the economic and social development of the peoples of the Community;
- Cognisant that a fully integrated and liberalised internal market will create favourable conditions for sustained, market-led production of goods and services on an internationally competitive basis;
- Desirous further of establishing and maintaining a sound and stable macro-economic environment that is conducive to investment, including cross-border investments, and the competitive production of goods and services in the Community;
- Believing that differences in resource endowment and in the levels of economic development of Member States, may affect the implementation of the Community Industrial Policy;
- Recognising also the potential of micro, small, and medium enterprise development to contribute to the expansion and viability of national economies of the Community and the importance of large enterprises for achieving economies of scale in the production process;
- Mindful that co-operation and joint action in developing trade relations with third States and in establishing appropriate regulatory and administrative procedures and services are essential for the development of the international and intraregional trade of Member States;
- Determined further to effect a fundamental transformation of the agricultural sector of the Community by diversifying agricultural production, intensifying agro-industrial development, expanding agri-business, strengthening the linkages between the agricultural sector and other sectors of the CSME and generally conducting agricultural production on a market-oriented, internationally competitive and environmentally sound basis;
- Acknowledging the vital importance of land, air and maritime transportation for maintaining economic, social and cultural linkages as well as facilitating emergency assistance among the Member States of the Community;
- Recognising further the importance of the establishment and structured development of transport links with third States for the accelerated and sustained development of the CSME;
- Conscious also of the importance of promoting adequate air and maritime transport services for the continued viability of the tourism industry and of reducing the vulnerability of the CARICOM Region resulting from its reliance on extra-regional carriers;
- Convinced also that a viable transport policy for the Community will make a significant contribution in satisfying the demands for the intra-regional movement of people and products in the CSME;
- Acknowledging further that some Member States, particularly the Less Developed Countries, are entering the CSME at a disadvantage by reason of the size, structure and vulnerability of their economies; and
- Believing further that the persistence of disadvantage, however arising, may impact adversely on the economic and social cohesion in the Community;
- Conscious further that disadvantaged countries, regions and sectors will require a transitional period to facilitate adjustment to competition in the CSME;
- Committed to establish effective measures, programs and mechanisms to assist disadvantaged countries, regions and sectors of the Community;
- Mindful further that the benefits expected from the establishment of the CSME are not frustrated by anti-competitive business conduct whose object or effect is to prevent, restrict, or distort competition;
- Convinced further that the application and convergence of national competition policies and the cooperation of competition authorities in the Community will promote the objectives of the CSME;
- Affirming that the employment of internationally accepted modes of disputes settlement in the Community will facilitate achievement of the objectives of the Treaty;
- Considering that an efficient, transparent, and authoritative system of disputes settlement in the Community will enhance the economic, social and other forms of activity in the CSME leading to confidence in the investment climate and further economic growth and development in the CSME;
- Affirming also that the original jurisdiction of the Caribbean Court of Justice is essential for the successful operation of the CSME;

== CARICOM Day ==
CARICOM Day is observed on the first Monday in July in Guyana to commemorate the signing of this treaty. In Cuba, the CARICOM-Cuba Day is observed on December 8 to celebrate diplomatic ties between the Caribbean Community (CARICOM) and Cuba.
