= The Pharma Letter =

Pharmaceutical and biotechnology news service

The Pharma Letter (or TPL), is an English pharmaceutical, generics and biotechnology news and analysis service.

== Description ==
Coverage includes:

- Company news. Financial reports, marketing developments, trends and strategies, corporate development, company profiles, legal influences, Research and Development trends, mergers and acquisitions activity, sales performance, stock market analyses and personnel appointments.
- Product news. Drug submissions, approvals and rejections, licensing arrangements, clinical trial developments and results, product development and new product introductions.
- European, USA, and World news. Regulatory developments, FDA/EMEA news, market legislation, pharma market movements, reviews of current and proposed legislation and regulation, conference details, and write-ups.

Barbara Obstoj is the Managing Editor, which in 2009 acquired the archives of The Pharma Marketletter, a publication Barbara owned since 1991 and prior to that edited when it was part of IMS Health. She was also the founding editor of Scrip World Pharmaceutical News from 1972 to 1976.
