= List of BRICS countries by economic and development indicators =

BRICS is an international organization currently comprising ten countries: Brazil, China, Egypt, Ethiopia, India, Indonesia, Iran, Russia, South Africa and the United Arab Emirates. This is the list of BRICS countries by economic and development indicators.

== List of member countries ==
| Country | GDP (Nominal) | GDP per capita (Nominal) | GDP (PPP) | PPP per capita | HDI (2023) | Life expectancy (World Bank group 2024) |
|---|---|---|---|---|---|---|
| China | $21,546.40 | $15,371 | $44,554.95 | $31,786 | ▲0.797 | ▲78.02 |
| India | $4,060.21 | $2,750 | $19,192.62 | $12,998 | ▲0.685 | ▲72.23 |
| Russia | $2,861.16 | $19,953 | $7,542.90 | $52,602 | ▲0.832 | ▲73.44 |
| Brazil | $2,654.76 | $12,397 | $5,266.51 | $24,594 | ▲0.786 | ▲76.02 |
| Indonesia | $1,479.95 | $5,153 | $5,483.04 | $19,091 | ▲0.728 | ▲71.29 |
| Saudi Arabia | $1,343.35 | $36,577 | $2,728.58 | $74,295 | ▲0.900 | ▲78.98 |
| United Arab Emirates | $661.02 | $57,109 | $968.84 | $83,704 | ▲0.940 | ▲83.07 |
| South Africa | $489.08 | $7,659 | $1,075.43 | $16,841 | ▲0.741 | ▲66.31 |
| Egypt | $442.89 | $4,024 | $2,600.03 | $23,624 | ▲0.754 | ▲71.81 |
| Iran | $311.95 | $3,548 | $1,772.67 | $20,159 | ▲0.799 | ▲77.85 |
| Ethiopia | $127.14 | $1,131 | $561.35 | $4,996 | ▲0.497 | ▲67.60 |
| Total | $35,977.91 | $9,001 | $91,747.25 | $22,940 | ▲0.741 | ▲74.45 |

== List of partner countries ==
| Country | GDP (Nominal) | GDP per capita (Nominal) | GDP (PPP) | PPP per capita | HDI (2023) | Life expectancy (World Bank group 2024) |
|---|---|---|---|---|---|---|
| Thailand | $599.12 | $8,372 | $1,983.94 | $27,724 | ▲0.798 | ▲76.56 |
| Malaysia | $547.10 | $15,981 | $1,624.40 | $47,453 | ▲0.819 | ▲76.82 |
| Vietnam | $542.13 | $5,259 | $2,058.90 | $19,974 | ▲0.766 | ▲74.74 |
| Kazakhstan | $397.92 | $19,311 | $996.31 | $48,351 | ▲0.837 | ▲74.53 |
| Nigeria | $386.67 | $1,594 | $2,438.18 | $10,051 | ▲0.560 | ▲54.63 |
| Uzbekistan | $178.17 | $4,575 | $561.58 | $14,421 | ▲0.740 | ▲72.53 |
| Cuba | $108.98 | $7,492 | $310.29 | $21,332 | ▲0.762 | ▲78.26 |
| Belarus | $108.11 | $11,963 | $325.56 | $36,025 | ▲0.824 | ▲74.37 |
| Uganda | $72.24 | $1,453 | $206.68 | $4,158 | ▲0.582 | ▲68.49 |
| Bolivia | $53.84 | $4,223 | $162.37 | $12,736 | ▲0.733 | ▲68.74 |
| Total | $2,994.28 | $5,017 | $10,668.21 | $17,878 | ▲0.751 | ▲66.40 |
