= Enlargement of Mercosur =

Mercosur (or Mercosul) has expanded a number of times throughout its history by way of the accession of new member states to the Union. To join Mercosur, a state needs to fulfil economic and political conditions called the Treaty of Asunción, which require a stable democratic government that respects the rule of law, and its corresponding freedoms and institutions.

== Criteria ==
According to the Treaties of Mercosur, membership of Mercosur "will be open to the accession, through negotiation, of the other members of the Latin American Integration Association.." (Uruguay Part). And their requirements would apply to join are:

- Membership in ALADI
- Unanimous approval
- Adoption of Fundamental Instruments
- Adoption of the Common External Tariff (CET)
- Incorporation into the Regulatory Framework
- Participation in negotiations

=== Example ===
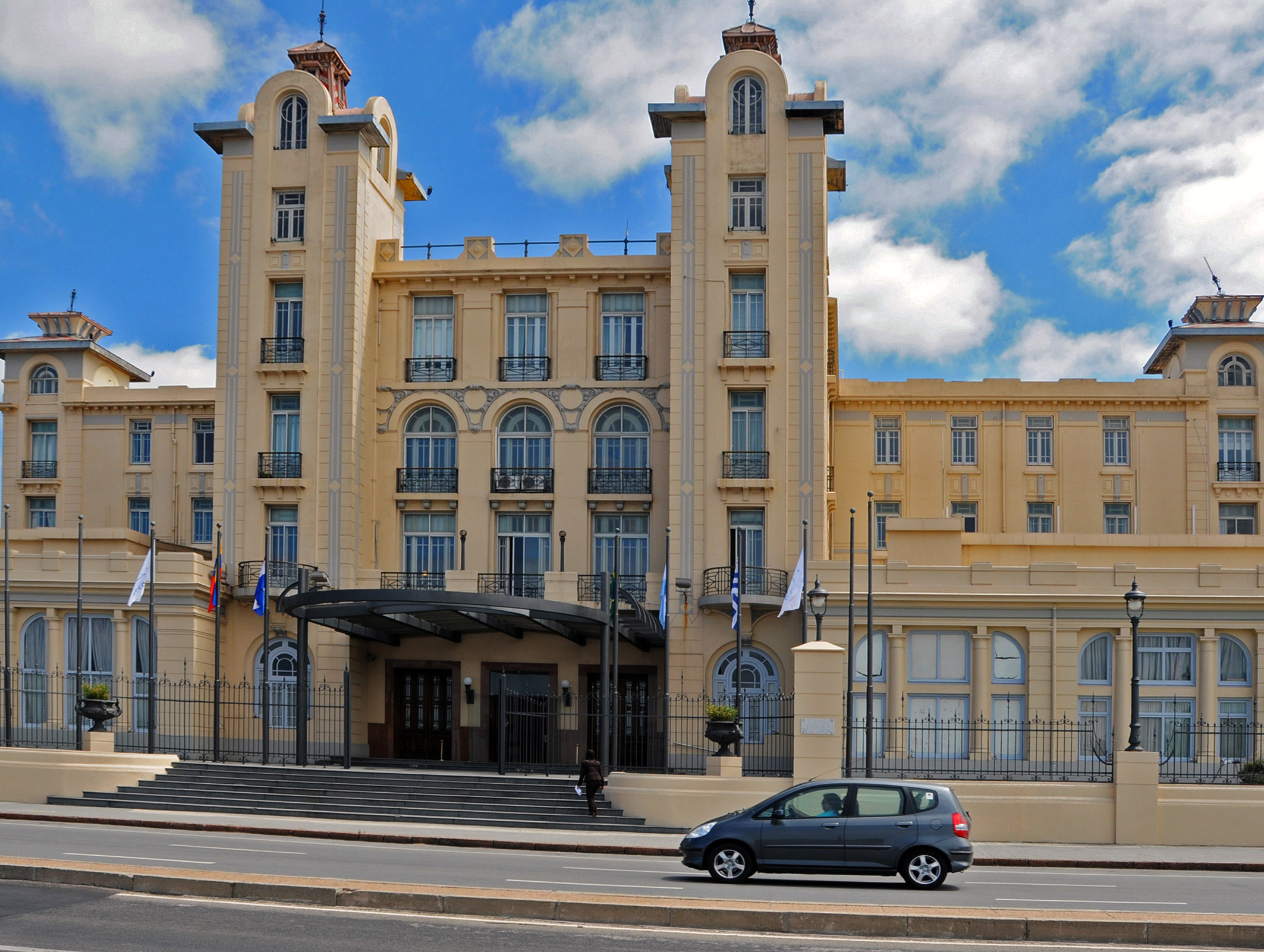
The Mercosur Commission, which plays a central role in the enlargement process.

The following is an example of the accession process—Bolivia's path to membership from its status as an observer member in 1998 with recognition from Mercosur, and then in 2006 by Bolivian President Evo Morales requesting to be a full member. Ease of accession depends on the state: how integrated it is with Mercosur beforehand, the state of its economy and public institutions, any outstanding political issues with Mercosur and (historically) how much law to date Mercosur has built up that the acceding state must adopt. This outline also includes integration steps taken by the accession country after it attains membership.

Bolivia Mercosur membership timeline
Date	Event
1998	Bolivia becomes an associate state of Mercosur.
2006	The government of Evo Morales requests full integration into the bloc.
2023	The accession protocol is formally delivered to then-President Luis Arce, and Brazil gives its final approval.
2024	Bolivia approves the accession protocol in its legislative bodies.
2024	The Chamber of Deputies did so on June 14 and the Chamber of Senators on July 3

== Historical enlargements ==
Applications for accession to Mercosur.
Applicant	Submitted	Accession / failure rationale
Argentina	Founder	26 March 1991
Brazil	Founder	26 March 1991
Bolivia	Since 2024	1 July 2024
Chile		Associate
Colombia		Associate
Guyana		Associate
Paraguay	Founder	26 March 1991
Panama		Associate
Peru		Associate
Uruguay	Founder	26 March 1991
Suriname		Associate
New Zealand		Observer
Mexico		Observer
Venezuela		Suspended

== Timeline ==
Pre-Mercosur

- On November 30, 1985, the presidents of Argentina and Brazil signed the Declaration of Foz do Iguaçu, the cornerstone of Mercosur. In 2004, Argentina and Brazil jointly decided that November 30 would be celebrated as the Argentine–Brazilian Friendship Day.
- On July 29, 1986, the Act for Argentine–Brazilian Integration was signed. Through this instrument, the Program for Integration and Cooperation between Argentina and Brazil (PICAB) was established, founded on the principles of gradualism, flexibility, symmetry, balance, preferential treatment toward third markets, progressive harmonization of policies, and business sector participation. The core of PICAB consisted of sectoral protocols in key sectors.
- On April 6, 1988, the Alvorada Act was signed, through which Uruguay joined the regional integration process.
- On November 29, 1988, the Treaty of Integration, Cooperation and Development was concluded. The treaty set a 10-year deadline for the gradual removal of asymmetries.
- On July 6, 1990, the Buenos Aires Act was signed, accelerating the integration schedule and setting December 31, 1994, as the date for establishing the common market.

Foundation

- On March 26, 1991, Argentina, Brazil, Paraguay, and Uruguay signed the Treaty of Asunción, which adopts the name Mercosur, gives it a basic institutional structure, and establishes a free trade area.

Expansions

- Chile formalized its association with Mercosur on June 25, 1996, during the 10th Mercosur Summit Meeting, in San Luis, Argentina, through the signing of the Mercosur–Chile Economic Complementation Agreement.
- Bolivia formalized its accession as an associate state at the 11th Mercosur Summit Meeting, in Fortaleza (Brazil), on December 17, 1996, through the signing of the Mercosur–Bolivia Economic Complementation Agreement.
- Peru formalized its association with Mercosur in 2003 by signing the Mercosur–Peru Economic Complementation Agreement (CMC No. 39/03).
- Colombia, Ecuador, and Venezuela formalized their association with Mercosur in 2004 through the signing of the Mercosur–Colombia, Ecuador, and Venezuela Economic Complementation Agreement (CMC No. 59/04).
- Venezuela signed the Protocol of Accession of Venezuela to Mercosur with the rest of the Mercosur members on July 4, 2006.

After being ratified by the congresses of Argentina, Brazil and Uruguay, and lacking only the ratification of the Paraguay congress, Venezuela remained waiting to become a full member until June 28, 2012, when Paraguay was suspended for breaching the bloc’s democratic agreement. Venezuela’s full ratification as a full member was announced on June 29, 2012 by the president of the group, and this would be formally executed in Rio de Janeiro on July 31, 2012, making it the first enlargement of the bloc since its establishment in 1994. On August 15, 2013, Mercosur lifted the suspension of Paraguay; on December 18, 2013, the Paraguayan Parliament ratified Venezuela’s entry into the regional bloc.

== See also ==
- Member states of Mercosur
