= German response to Kyoto Protocol =

Germany is Europe's largest and the world's sixth greatest single emitter of CO_{2}. In July 2007, Germany had the largest European population, with 82.4 million people. Germany imports most of its materials and energy sources, and in 2004 imported 2.135 million barrels of oil and 85.02 billion m³ (2003) of natural gas a day. In 2004, Germany emitted 886 million metric tonnes of CO_{2}. In 2004, there were approximately 45 million registered cars in Germany.

Between March 1998 and March 1999, 84 countries including Germany signed the Kyoto Protocol. In March 2002, the Bundestag unanimously ratified Kyoto. In May 2002, the European Union submitted the articles of ratification for all 15 of its then member states.

As an Annex II nation, Germany's commitment to the UNFCCC with respect to Kyoto was to reduce emissions as well as to provide an economic crutch to developing nations via Clean Development Mechanisms.

In November 2006, Germany's planned annual quota was 482 million metric tonnes of CO_{2}. German Greenhouse Gas Emissions reduced by 17.2% from 1990 to 2004, according to UNFCCC. Germany actively promotes government carbon funds and supports multilateral carbon funds that are intent on purchasing Carbon Credits from non-Annex I parties. Government organizations work closely with major utility, energy, oil and gas, and chemicals conglomerates to try to acquire as many Greenhouse Gas Certificates as cheaply as possible.

Since signing and ratifying the protocol, Germany has committed to reducing its emissions to 21% below 1990 levels between 2008 and 2012. In November 2008, a study found that Germany had already reduced its greenhouse gas emissions by 22.4%, which means it already reached its Kyoto Emissions Commitments.

== Some of Germany's achievements since signing the protocol ==
- So far Germany has reduced CO_{2} emissions by 22.4%.
- Germany has topped world production in wind energy with more than 16,000 wind turbines, which generate 39% of the world's total wind power.
- Germany played a key role in installing 64% of the solar energy generation capacity in 2003.

Germany has also signed a climate change agreement alongside Israel, Jordan, and Egypt. This agreement is designed to make it easier and cheaper for industrialized countries such as Germany to meet their greenhouse gas emission reduction targets under the protocol.

== Next steps ==
- Germany plans to generate 20% of its energy from renewable energy sources by 2020.
