= Scrip World Pharmaceutical News =

British healthcare newspaper

- Type: News and analysis service
- Format: Daily online
- Owner: Citeline
- Publisher: Philip Jarvis
- Founded: March 1972
- Headquarters: London, England
- Website: www.scripnews.com

Scrip Intelligence (Scrip) is an English language international pharmaceutical news, analysis and data service. First published as a weekly print newsletter in March 1972, Scrip included articles on side-effects, regulatory changes and mergers and acquisitions.

== Overview ==
Scrip World Pharmaceutical News was initially published by advertising company J Walter Thomson but was bought by Dr Philip J Brown in 1976 for £2000, who founded PJB Publishing. Brown sold Scrip, associated titles, and his company to Informa for £150 million in 2003.

Scrip has now developed into an online global pharma news and analysis service. It provides daily news and analysis on the biotechnology and pharmaceutical industry including areas such as policy & regulation, business news, research & development, generics, drug delivery, and clinical trials.

In 2022, Informa sold its Pharma Intelligence division, including Scrip, to Warburg Pincus. The business was renamed Citeline. Later in 2022, Citeline was acquired by Norstella.

== Editors ==
- Barbara Obstoj (1972–76)
- Philip Brown (1977–86)
- Moira Dower (1986–96)
- John Davis (1997–2007)
- Alex Shimmings (2007–2010)
- Mike Ward (2010–2012)
- Eleanor Malone (2014–present)

== Subscribers ==
The Scrip readership has grown to over 100,000 worldwide, half of which are in Europe. Scrip is read by managers and executives working across all disciplines in pharmaceutical and biotech companies worldwide.

== Editorial team ==
Scrip has a large independent editorial team of 21. The journalists are based throughout the world in Washington, D.C., Tokyo, India, and London to ensure a global emphasis to the latest news stories.

- "Science desk" - The R&D section tracks the fortune of marketed and developmental drugs, from clinical data to their passage through the regulatory process.
- "Europe coverage" - Scrip's Europe based desk covers all the political and regulatory developments that affect the pharmaceutical industry in the 27 member states, other European countries and the Russian Federation.
- "US coverage" - Scrip's US team details the political developments from Washington affecting the global pharma industry, such as U.S. Food and Drug Administration safety and regulatory matters, as well as litigation, Generics and pharmacy.
- "World coverage" - Scrip's locally based world coverage focuses on Japan and other Pacific Rim markets, Asia and Latin America.
- "Business news" - Scrip's global reporters bring information on financial and business affairs in the pharma and biotech sectors.
- "Analyst team" - Scrip's analysts offer an insight into the industry's more significant developments.
