= Member states of the Shanghai Cooperation Organisation =

Members Observers Dialogue Partners Disputed territories

The Shanghai Cooperation Organisation (SCO) is an international alliance that consists of 10 member states and 2 observers from Eurasia. It was established on 26 April 1996 as the Shanghai Five. In addition to the 10 member states and 2 observers, the SCO currently has 14 dialogue partners and 4 guest attendance entries.

== Member states ==
Flag	Country	Capital	Largest city	Area (km^{2})	Population (2024)	Density (/km^{2})	GDP per cap. (PPP)	HDI	Currency	Official languages	Leaders	Accession
	China (Note: The sovereignty of China is disputed. Since the conclusion of the Chinese Civil War, the Republic of China (ROC), which was formally established on 1 January 1912 following the Xinhai Revolution, which succeeded the former Qing dynasty's territories on mainland China, while the islands of Taiwan and Penghu were under Japanese rule at the time. The ROC gained control over the latter after the surrender of Japan in 1945, but soon lost its control of mainland to the communists due to the Chinese Civil War. The ROC government was relocated to Taipei in 7 December 1949 as its provisional capital and retains actual rule over the islands of Taiwan, Penghu, Kinmen, the Matsu, and other minor islands, all of which are collectively known as "Free Area" or Taiwan Area in contrast to Mainland China being under communist rule, thus making it a de facto island nation, and has become known colloquially as simply "Taiwan" due to the island of Taiwan forming the majority of the ROC-controlled territories; nonetheless, the ROC has not officially renounced its constitutional-defined territories which include areas effectively controlled by the People's Republic of China, Mongolia, Tuva (a Russian republic) etc. If claimed territories were taken into account, the ROC would not be a borderless country, nor a country centred around a major island. The ROC-controlled territories are also claimed by the People's Republic of China. Constitutionally, the ROC on Taiwan still views itself as the continuation of former Chinese republic, with legitimate sovereignty over mainland China despite no actual control. See: Political status of Taiwan, Retreat of the Republic of China to Taiwan, Four-Stage Theory of the Republic of China, Two Chinas, One-China policy, and Cross-strait relations.); People's Republic of China	Beijing	Shanghai(city proper); Chongqing(metropolitan area)	9,640,011 (Note: The actual area under PRC control is 9,596,960.)	1,374,820,000	139.6	26,310	0.788	Renminbi (Chinese yuan, ¥) (CNY)	Standard Chinese written in simplified characters see also languages of China	Paramount Leader and Head of State: Xi Jinping Head of Government: Li Qiang	1996-04-26
	Kazakhstan; Republic of Kazakhstan	Astana	Almaty	2,724,900	17,670,900	5.94	41,366	0.802	Kazakhstani tenge (₸) (KZT)	Kazakh (National); Russian	Head of State: Kassym Jomart Tokayev Head of Government: Ojlas Bektenov	1996-04-26
Kyrgyzstan	Kyrgyzstan; Kyrgyz Republic	Bishkek		199,900	6,008,600	27.4	7,773	0.701	Kyrgyzstani som (som) (KGS)	Kyrgyz (National); Russian	Head of State and Government: Sadyr Japarov	1996-04-26
Russia	Russia; Russian Federation	Moscow		17,075,400	146,519,759	8.3	47,299	0.821	Russian rouble (₽) (RUB)	Russian also see Languages of Russia	Head of State: Vladimir Putin Head of Government: Mikhail Mishustin	1996-04-26
	Tajikistan; Republic of Tajikistan	Dushanbe		143,100	8,352,000	48.6	5,533	0.679	Tajikistani somoni (SM) (TJS)	Tajik Persian	Head of State: Emomali Rahmon Prime Minister: Kokhir Rasulzoda	1996-04-26
	Uzbekistan; Republic of Uzbekistan	Tashkent		447,400	31,022,500	61.4	11,596	0.727	Uzbekistani soum (soum) (UZS)	Uzbek	Head of State: Shavkat Mirziyoyev Head of Government: Abdulla Aripov	2001-06-15
	India; Republic of India	New Delhi	Mumbai	3,287,263	1,450,936,000	488	11,158	0.685	Indian rupee (₹) (INR)	Hindi (Devanagari script)&, English . Also see Languages of India	Head of State: Droupadi Murmu Head of Government: Narendra Modi	2017-06-09
	Pakistan; Islamic Republic of Pakistan	Islamabad	Karachi	881,913	241,499,431	273.8	$6,715	0.540	Pakistani rupee (Rs) (PKR)	Urdu (National); English	Head of State: Asif Ali Zardari Head of Government: Shehbaz Sharif	2017-06-09
	Iran; Islamic Republic of Iran	Tehran		1,648,195	79,011,700	48.0	19,607	0.780	Iranian rial (Rl) (IRR)	Persian	Supreme Leader and Head of State: Ali Khamenei Head of Government: Masoud Pezeshkian	2023-07-04
	Belarus; Republic of Belarus	Minsk		207,595	9,498,700	45.8	32,098	0.801	Belarusian rubel (Rbl) (BYR)	Belarusian; Russian	Head of State and Government: Alexander Lukashenko Prime Minister: Roman Golovchenko	2024-07-04

=== Military personnel ===
The following list is sourced from the 2018 edition of "The Military Balance" published annually by the International Institute for Strategic Studies.

Country	Active military	Reserve military	Paramilitary	Total	Per 1000 capita (total)	Per 1000 capita (active)	References
China	2,035,000	510,000	1,500,000	4,045,000	2.9	1.5	
India	1,440,000	2,096,000	1,585,950	5,121,950	4	1.1	
Iran	610,000	350,000	40,000	1,000,000	11.4	7	
Kazakhstan	39,000	0	31,500	70,500	3.8	2.1	
Kyrgyzstan	10,900	0	9,500	20,400	3.5	1.9	
Pakistan	653,000	0	0	653,000	3.1	3.1	
Russia	1,013,628	2,572,500	2,310,859	5,896,987	41.5	7.1	(Note: The potential reserve personnel of Russia may be as high as 20 million, depending on how the figures are counted. However, an est. 2 million have seen military service within the last 5 years.)
Tajikistan	8,800	0	7,500	16,300	1.9	1	
Uzbekistan	48,000	0	20,000	68,000	2.3	1.6	

== Observer states ==
Flag	Country	Capital	Area (km^{2})	Population (2024)	Density (/km^{2})	GDP per cap. (PPP)	Currency	Official languages	Leaders	Status gained
	Mongolia	Ulaanbaatar	1,564,115	3,475,540	2	$16,504	Mongolian tögrög (₮) (MNT)	Mongolian	Head of State: Ukhnaagiin Khürelsükh; Head of Government: Luvsannamsrain Oyun-Erdene	2004-06-17
Islamic Emirate of Afghanistan	Afghanistan	Kabul	652,857	41,128,771	48.08	$2,459	Afghan Afghani (؋) (AFN)	Pashto; Dari	De facto Supreme Leader and Head of State: Hibatullah Akhundzada; De facto head of government: Hasan Akhund	2012

== Dialogue partner entries ==
Flag	Country	Capital	Area (km^{2})	Population (2016)	Density (/km^{2})	GDP per cap. (PPP)	HDI	Currency	Official languages	Leaders	Status gained
	Sri Lanka; Democratic Socialist Republic of Sri Lanka	Sri Jayawardenepura Kotte (Administrative); Colombo (Commercial)	65,610	20,966,000	309.0	10,410	0.757	Sri Lankan rupee (Rs) (LKR)	Sinhalese; Tamil	Head of State and Government: Anura Kumara Dissanayake (Prime Minister: Harini Amarasuriya)	2009-06-16
Turkey	Turkey; Republic of Türkiye	Ankara	783,562	78,741,053	102.0	19,698	0.761	Turkish lira (₺) (TRY)	Turkish	Head of State and Government: Recep Tayyip Erdoğan	2012-06-07
	Armenia; Republic of Armenia	Yerevan	29,743	2,998,600	102.0	8,164	0.733	Armenian dram (֏) (AMD)	Armenian	Head of State: Vahagn Khachaturyan; Head of Government: Nikol Pashinyan	2015-07-10
	Azerbaijan; Republic of Azerbaijan	Baku	86,600	9,696,800	109.0	17,761	0.751	Azerbaijani manat (₼) (AZN)	Azeri	Head of State: Ilham Aliyev; Head of Government: Ali Asadov	2015-07-10
	Cambodia; Kingdom of Cambodia	Phnom Penh	181,035	15,626,444	84.0	3,276	0.555	Cambodian riel (CR) (KHR)	Khmer	Head of State: Norodom Sihamoni; Head of Government: Hun Manet	2015-07-10
	Nepal; Federal Democratic Republic of Nepal	Kathmandu	147,181	28,431,500	180.0	2,388	0.548	Nepalese rupee (Rs) (NPR)	Nepali	Head of State: Ram Chandra Poudel; Head of Government: KP Sharma Oli	2015-07-10
	Egypt; Arab Republic of Egypt	Cairo	1,010,408	94,798,827	103.56	16,980	0.731	Egyptian pound (LE) (EGP)	Arabic	Head of State: Abdel Fattah el-Sisi; Head of Government: Moustafa Madbouly	2022-09-14
	Qatar; State of Qatar	Doha	11,581	1,699,435	176	113,675	0.855	Qatari riyal (QAR)	Arabic	Head of State: Tamim bin Hamad; Head of Government: Mohammed bin Abdulrahman bin Jassim Al Thani	2022-09-14
	Saudi Arabia; Kingdom of Saudi Arabia	Riyadh	2,149,690	38,401,000	15	67,019	0.875	Saudi riyal (SR) (SAR)	Arabic	Head of State: Salman; Head of Government: Mohammed bin Salman	2022-09-14
	Kuwait; State of Kuwait	Kuwait City	17,818	4,294,621	200.2	38,123	0.831	Kuwaiti dinar	Arabic	Head of State: Mishal Al-Ahmad Al-Jaber Al-Sabah; Head of Government: Ahmad Nawaf Al-Ahmad Al-Sabah	2023-05-06
	Maldives; Republic of Maldives	Malé	300	515,122	1,102.5	36,358	0.747	Maldivian rufiyaa (MVR)	Maldivian	Head of State and Government: Ibrahim Mohamed Solih	2023-05-06
	Myanmar; Republic of the Union of Myanmar	Naypyidaw	261,227	57,526,449	196.8	5,132	0.585	Myanmar Kyat (K) (MMK)	Burmese	Head of State: Myint Swe (acting); Head of Government: Min Aung Hlaing	2023-05-06
	United Arab Emirates	Abu Dhabi	83,600	4,106,427	121	78,255	0.911	UAE dirham (AED)	Arabic	Head of State: Mohamed bin Zayed Al Nahyan; Head of Government: Mohammed bin Rashid Al Maktoum	2023-05-06
	Bahrain; Kingdom of Bahrain	Manama	780	1,504,365	1,864	60,596	0.875	Bahraini dinar (BHD)	Arabic	Head of State: Hamad bin Isa Al Khalifa; Head of Government: Salman bin Hamad Al Khalifa	2023-07-15
Laos	Laos; Lao People's Democratic Republic	Vientiane	236,800	7,749,595	26.7	9,787	0.620	Lao kip (LAK)	Lao	Supreme Leader and Head of State: Thongloun Sisoulith; Head of Government: Sonexay Siphandone	2026-07-10

== Future participation ==
The following countries have applied for a position in the organization:

Flag	Country	Capital	Area (km^{2})	Population (2016)	Density (/km^{2})	GDP per cap. (PPP)	HDI	Currency	Official languages	Leaders	Status applied for	Year applied
	Bangladesh; People's Republic of Bangladesh	Dhaka	148,460	169,828,911	1,305	2,470	0.661	Bangladeshi taka (BDT)	Bengali	Head of State: Mohammed Shahabuddin Chief Adviser: Muhammad Yunus	Observer	2012
Syrian revolution	Syria; Syrian Arab Republic	Damascus	185,180	22,933,531	118.3	2,900	0.577	Syrian pound (SYP)	Arabic	Head of State: Ahmed al-Sharaa (Prime Minister: Mohammad al-Bashar)	Dialogue Partner	2015 (Note: Ba'athist Syria had initially applied for observer status in 2015, but "it was explained that first it is necessary to become a dialogue partner of the organization". The status is unclear after the fall of the Assad regime in 2024.)
	Israel; State of Israel	Jerusalem (Note: Jerusalem is the capital under Israeli law with a number of governmental institutions located there and is only recognized by the United States, Kosovo, Guatemala and Honduras. While Israel has sovereignty of West Jerusalem, the international community considers East Jerusalem as part of the Palestinian territories under Israeli occupation since 1967. Consequently, most of the foreign embassies reside in Tel Aviv. See the status of Jerusalem for further details.)	20,770	9,766,400	442	54,997	0.919	Israeli new shekel (ILS)	Hebrew	Head of State: Isaac Herzog Head of Government: Benjamin Netanyahu	Dialogue Partner	2016
	Iraq; Republic of Iraq	Baghdad	438,317	43,500,000	82.7	12,141	0.686	Iraqi dinar (IQD)	Arabic	Head of State: Abdul Latif Rashid; Head of Government: Mohammed Shia' Al Sudani	Dialogue Partner	2019
	Algeria; People's Democratic Republic of Algeria	Algiers	2,381,741	44,700,000	17.7	13,324	0.745	Algerian dinar (DZD)	Arabic	Head of State: Abdelmadjid Tebboune; Head of Government: Aymen Benabderrahmane	Observer	2023

In 2012, Ukraine expressed interest in obtaining observer status. However, since the deposition of President Viktor Yanukovych and increased tensions with Russia, no application has been submitted and there are no current plans to incorporate Ukraine into the organization.

In 2011, Vietnam expressed interest in obtaining observer or dialogue partner status. However, it is unknown whether or not, Vietnam has submitted an application. On April 17, 2026, it was reported that during a state visit to China by Vietnamese President Tô Lâm, Vietnam "expressed its readiness to maintain exchanges on the possibility of becoming a partner of the SCO."

== Guest attendance entries ==
- Association of Southeast Asian Nations (ASEAN)
- Commonwealth of Independent States (CIS)
- Turkmenistan
- United Nations

== Inactive ==
Flag	Country	Capital	Area (km^{2})	Population (2024)	Density (/km^{2})	GDP per cap. (PPP)	HDI	Currency	Official languages	Leaders	Status gained
Taliban	Afghanistan	Kabul	652,867	41,128,771	48.08	$2,459	0.462	Afghan afghani (Af) (AFN)	Pashto; Dari	De facto Supreme Leader: Hibatullah Akhundzada; De facto head of government: Hasan Akhund	2012-06-07 (Observer)

== Membership declined ==
The United States applied for observer status in the SCO, but was rejected in 2005.

== See also ==
- Member states of BRICS
- Member states of the Eurasian Economic Union

== Bibliography ==
- International Institute for Strategic Studies (3 February 2010). The Military Balance 2010. London: Routledge. ISBN 978-1857435573.
- International Institute for Strategic Studies (2 March 2011). The Military Balance 2011. London: Routledge. ISBN 978-1857436068.
- International Institute for Strategic Studies (7 March 2012). The Military Balance 2012. London: Routledge. ISBN 978-1857436426.
- International Institute for Strategic Studies (14 March 2013). The Military Balance 2013. London: Routledge. ISBN 978-1857436808.
- International Institute for Strategic Studies (3 February 2014). The Military Balance 2014. London: Routledge. ISBN 9781857437225.
- International Institute for Strategic Studies (14 February 2018). The Military Balance 2018. London: Routledge. ISBN 9781857439557.
