= Member states of the World Sports Alliance =

On February 25, 2013, the Republic of Sierra Leone became the 31st Member State of the intergovernmental World Sports Alliance (WSA). The Membership Application and Membership Memorandum of Understanding were signed on behalf of the Government by Paul Kamara, the Minister of Sports. The WSA has 31 member states.

On December 1 7, 2012, the Republic of Tunisia became the 29th member state with the signing of the Membership Documents by Tarek Dhiab, the Minister of Youth and Sports.

WSA-IGO was created following the adoption of the Rabat Declaration in Morocco, in May 2007 by the Kingdom of Morocco, the Republic of Niger, and the Dominican Republic, and its subsequent presentation and registration with the Economic and Social Council UN-ECOSOC (E/2007/NGO/1)(3) in July 2007. By April 2009 WSA had grown to include 24 Member states, increasing to 27 in January 2009, with a combined population base of 574 million.

Pursuant to the accession process, the Sports and Youth Minister of each member state becomes the lead representative of their government within WSA.

The decision to organize as an Intergovernmental Organization (IGO) was strategic. An IGO is an organization made up primarily of Sovereign States, referred to as its Member States, and requires the membership of a minimum of three (3) countries in order to qualify as an IGO. Examples of IGO's include the United Nations, the European Union, and NATO.

This organizational form permits WSA to work in direct concert with its Member States through the Sports and Youth Ministries of each Member State on the social and academic aspects of the WSA programs. At the same time, this structure also enables WSA to work in direct contact with the Heads of State, the Prime Ministers and Ministers of each of its Member States on matters pertaining to the Public Private Partnerships in order to encourage and reinforce the participation of Countries in their own sustainable and responsible development.

Further, by providing access to the highest levels of governments, the IGO status also provides WSA with the means to broaden support among non Member States for the strategy of using education through sports to engage the youth of a country in order to educate and then involve them in the development of their communities and society at large. Bangladesh is the last member of WSA. They are the 34th membering country, it was held on 17 November 2019.

== Current members ==
The member states are listed below with their respective dates of admission.

The table below uses the official names of the member states used by the WSA-IGO, and can also be sorted by their dates of admissions by clicking on the button in the column header.

Note: Member states with background color and bold font are original members.

Country	Date
Morocco	29 May 2007
Niger	7 May 2007
Dominican Republic	4 May 2007
Zambia	9 June 2007
Uganda	30 July 2007
Guinea	3 August 2007
Benin	21 September 2007
Panama	24 September 2007
Senegal	31 October 2007
Burkina Faso	24 December 2007
Togo	31 December 2007
Central African Republic	25 January 2008
Côte d'Ivoire	3 February 2008
Chile	8 May 2008
Rio Grande do Norte	30 May 2008
Gauteng	17 July 2008
Congo, Republic of the	20 August 2008
Haiti	25 September 2008
Madagascar	5 October 2008
Liberia	21 October 2008
Costa Rica	30 October 2008
Democratic Republic of the Congo	13 December 2008
Chad	14 February 2009
Burundi	25 March 2009
Catalonia	17 May 2009
Rwanda	8 September 2009
Tunisia	17 December 2012
Sierra Leone	25 February 2013
Bangladesh	17 November 2019
Albania	30 April 2022
Gabon	30 April 2022
Saint Pierre and Miquelon	30 April 2022
Dominica	12 October 2022
Canary Islands	13 April 2024
Lebanon	13 April 2024
French Polynesia	27 May 2024
Suriname	28 May 2024
Anguilla	31 May 2024
Armenia	4 June 2024
Equatorial Guinea	4 June 2024
Mali	4 June 2024
Uzbekistan	4 June 2024
Saba	7 June 2024
Sergipe	23 June 2024
Cambodia	23 June 2024
Honduras	10 February 2025
Azerbaijan	21 March 2025
Colombia	21 March 2025
Ethiopia	21 March 2025
Guyana	21 March 2025
Jordan	21 March 2025
Kyrgyzstan	21 March 2025
Nepal	21 March 2025
Malawi	5 May 2025
Cameroon	6 May 2025
Eritrea	6 May 2025
Mozambique	6 May 2025
Grenada	1 August 2025
Saint Vincent and the Grenadines	4 August 2025
Algeria	22 September 2025
Sri Lanka	22 September 2025
China	23 September 2025
Tanzania	23 September 2025
Veneto	23 September 2025
Bosnia and Herzegovina	26 September 2025
Czechia	26 September 2025
Estonia	26 September 2025
Greece	26 September 2025
Iceland	26 September 2025
Kosovo	26 September 2025
Lithuania	26 September 2025
North Macedonia	26 September 2025
Poland	26 September 2025
Serbia	26 September 2025
Ukraine	26 September 2025

== Footnotes ==
1. United Nations Millennium Development Goals (1)
2. Rabat Declaration(2) http://www.omdg.org/en/index.php?searchword=world+sports+allianc&ordering=&searchphrase=all&option=com_search
3. UN- ECOSOC (E/2007/NGO/1) in July 2007. (3)
4. AIESIS http://www.omdg.org/en/index.php?option=com_content&view=article&id=128&Itemid=70
5. Regional Roundtables held in Paris, Algiers, Brasília and Beijing respectively.(4)
6. Public Private Partnership (PPP) as an innovative means of financing sustainable development.(5)
7. Unleashing Entrepreneurship (6)
