= Member states of ALBA =

Map of member states

ALBA (Bolivarian Alliance for the Americas) has 10 member states and three observer states. In addition, Suriname is a "special guest member" which intends to become a full member.

== History ==
When it was launched, ALBA had two member states, Venezuela and Cuba. Subsequently, a number of other Latin American and Caribbean nations have entered into this Peoples' Trade Agreement (Spanish: Tratado de Comercio de los Pueblos, or TCP) which aims to implement the principles of ALBA.

President Evo Morales, of poor but natural gas-rich Bolivia, joined the TCP on 29 April 2006, only days before he announced his intention to nationalize Bolivia's hydrocarbon assets. Bolivia is a member of both UNASUR and ALBA, thus its attitude is crucial to relations between the two, says Marion Hörmann, since Bolivia is traditionally seen as a mediator between the Andean countries and the rest of South America. Venezuela and Ecuador are also members of UNASUR.

Newly elected President Daniel Ortega of Nicaragua signed the agreement in January 2007. However, Nicaragua is also a member of the Central America Free Trade Agreement (CAFTA).

Ecuador officially joined in June 2009.

In January 2008, the Caribbean island nation of Dominica joined ALBA.

In April 2009, Saint Vincent and the Grenadines was accepted as the seventh member of ALBA, while Grenada stated publicly that it was not yet ready to join the bloc.

In June 2009, the Prime Minister of Jamaica said he would seek to address the future of the Caribbean Community (CARICOM) given the effects of ALBA and Trinidad and Tobago's proposed political union with the OECS on the Caribbean Community as the two main elements he says will have a "destabilising effect" on the Caribbean Community (CARICOM) bloc.

Antigua and Barbuda, Ecuador and Saint Vincent and the Grenadines formally joined ALBA on 24 June 2009.

On 25 August 2008, Honduran President Manuel Zelaya signed an agreement to join the ALBA, with a rally in front of the Presidential House that was attended by many of the presidents of the countries that are part of ALBA, including Chávez and Morales. The Honduran congress – led by Roberto Micheletti, who later became Zelaya's main political enemy, and president of the interim government after the 2009 Honduran coup d'état – approved ALBA on 9 October 2008. On 16 December 2009, the Honduran congress met to withdraw the country from the ALBA, claiming a "lack of respect" from Venezuela since the country's joining in 2008, citing in particular Hugo Chavez' remarks about a potential invasion of Honduras to restore Manuel Zelaya to office, after he was removed on 28 June 2009 in the 2009 Honduran coup d'état. Withdrawal from ALBA was ratified by the Honduran Congress on 13 January 2010. Economic relations with Venezuela continue, including via Petrocaribe.

Saint Lucia joined as a full member on 30 July 2013. Grenada and Saint Kitts and Nevis became members on 14 December 2014. With their accession, all independent countries in the Lesser Antilles except Barbados and Trinidad and Tobago are now members.

Ecuador announced its withdrawal from ALBA on 23 August 2018.

Bolivia's interim government withdrew in November 2019 during the political crisis, but rejoined following the 2020 Bolivian general election. Following the 2025 Bolivian general election, Bolivia was suspended by ALBA.

== Member states ==
Common name	Official name	Date joined	Population	Area (km^{2})	GDP PPP (US$ bn)	Capital
Antigua and Barbuda	Antigua and Barbuda	2009-06-24	85,632	442	1.546	St. John's
Bolivia (suspended)	Plurinational State of Bolivia	2006-04-29	9,119,152	1,098,581	43.424	Sucre
Cuba	Republic of Cuba	2004-12-14	11,451,652	110,861	108.2	Havana
Dominica	Commonwealth of Dominica	2008-01-20	72,660	754	.72	Roseau
Grenada	Grenada	2014-12-14	109,590	348		St. George's
Nicaragua	Republic of Nicaragua	2007-01-11	5,891,199	129,495	15.89	Managua
Saint Kitts and Nevis	Federation of Saint Christopher and Nevis	2014-12-14	51,538	261		Basseterre
Saint Lucia	Saint Lucia	2013-07-20	180,870	617	2.101	Castries
Saint Vincent and the Grenadines	Saint Vincent and the Grenadines	2009-06-24	120,000	389	1.085	Kingstown
Venezuela	Bolivarian Republic of Venezuela	2004-12-14	28,199,825	916,445	358.623	Caracas
ALBA Totals	10 Countries	–	69,513,221	2,513,337	636.481	

=== Observer states ===
Common name	Official name	Population	Capital
Haiti	Republic of Haiti	10,847,334	Port-au-Prince
Iran	Islamic Republic of Iran	81,672,300	Tehran

=== Former member states ===
Common name	Official name	Date joined	Date withdrawn	Population	Area (km^{2})	GDP PPP (US$ bn)	Capital
Honduras	Republic of Honduras	2008-08-25	2009-12-16	10,278,345	112,492	5,492	Tegucigalpa
Ecuador	Republic of Ecuador	2009-06-24	2018-08-23	14,573,101	256,370	106.993	Quito

=== Former observer states ===
Common name	Official name	Population	Capital	Date joined	Date withdrawn
Syria	Syrian Arab Republic	18,284,407	Damascus	2010-10-21	2024-10-08
