= Member states of the World Intellectual Property Organization =

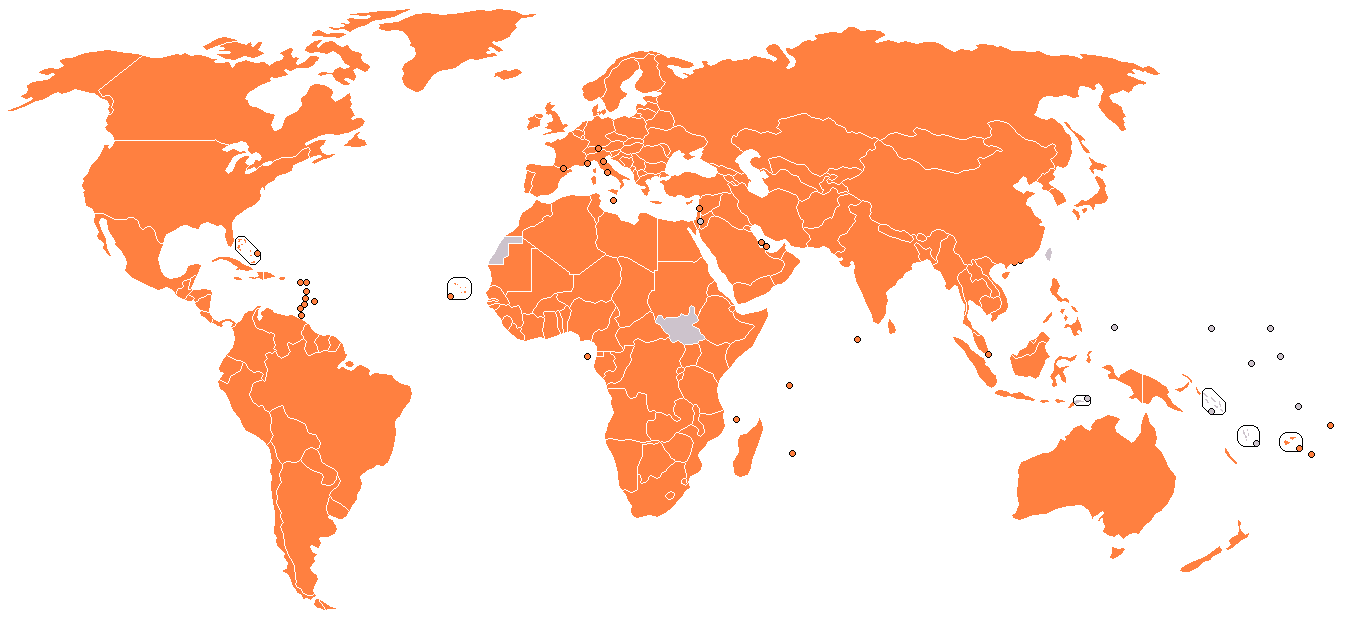
WIPO members Members Non-members

The World Intellectual Property Organization (WIPO) is one of the 16 specialized agencies of the United Nations.

WIPO currently has 194 member states. 190 of the UN Members as well as the Holy See, Niue and the Cook Islands are Members of WIPO. Non-members are the states of Palau, South Sudan, and the states with limited recognition. Palestine has observer status.

== History ==
- 27 March 2000: Dominican Republic joins
- 2 March 2012: Vanuatu joins
- 11/12 December 2017: East Timor and the Marshall Islands join
- 4 July 2019: Solomon Islands join
- 11 May 2020: Nauru joins
- 19 June 2025: The Federated States of Micronesia joins
