= Member state =

State that is a member of an international organisation

A member state is a state that is a member of an international organization, federation, or confederation.

Since the World Trade Organization (WTO) and the International Monetary Fund (IMF) include some members that are not sovereign states, neither organization ever speaks of "member states". The WTO has simply "members" (see WTO members), and the IMF refers to its members as "member countries".

The oldest global member state based organization is the International Telecommunication Union, which joined the United Nations System as a specialized agency after the creation of the UN.

== Worldwide ==
- Member states of the United Nations | 193
- Member states of the International Telecommunication Union | 193
- Member states of UNESCO | 195
- Interpol § Members | 190
- Member states of the World Intellectual Property Organization | 184
- Member states of the World Sports Alliance | 49
- Member states of the League of Nations
- Member states of the Venice Commission | 58
- Member states of the World Customs Organization | 173 sovereign states, 4 customs territories and one customs union
- Member states of the World Trade Organization | 166
- International Hydrographic Organization § Member countries
- International Centre for the Study of the Preservation and Restoration of Cultural Property § Member states
- Alliance of Small Island States § Member states | 39
- Intersputnik § Member states
- World Health Organization | 194

=== Worldwide - language related ===
- Member states of the Arab League | 22
- Member states of the Dutch Language Union | 3
- Member states of the Commonwealth of Nations | 56
- Member states of the Latin Union | 36
- Member states of the Community of Portuguese Language Countries | 8
- Member states of the International Organization of the Francophonie
- Member states of the Organization of Ibero-American States | 24

=== Worldwide - religion related ===
- Member states of the Organisation of Islamic Cooperation | 57

=== Worldwide - commodity related ===
- Member states of the International Atomic Energy Agency | 167
- Member states of OPEC | 12
- Member states of CIP | 14
- Member states of the Organisation for the Prohibition of Chemical Weapons | 195+

== Restricted to a continent or larger region ==
	Count	Region	Note
Member states of the Council of Europe	47	Europe	
Member state of the European Union	27	Europe	
Member states of the European Economic Area	30	Europe	EU + Iceland, Liechtenstein, Norway
Member states of the European Environment Agency	32	Europe	EU + Iceland, Liechtenstein, Norway, Switzerland, Turkey
Member states of the European Aviation Safety Agency	31	Europe	EU + Iceland, Liechtenstein, Norway, Switzerland
Member states of the European Union Customs Union	31	Europe	EU + Turkey, San Marino, Andorra, Monaco
Member states of the Eurozone	21	Europe	
Member states of the European Free Trade Association	4	Europe	
Member states of the Organization of the Black Sea Economic Cooperation		Europe	
Central European Free Trade Agreement		Europe	
Member states of the European Southern Observatory	15	Europe	
Nordic Council#Members	5	Europe	
Council of the Baltic Sea States#Member states		Europe	
Western European and Others Group#WEOG Member States		Europe	
Eastern European Group#Members		Europe	
European Space Agency	22	Europe	1 Associate Canada
Member states of the Organization of American States	35	America	+75 Permanent Observers
Member states of the Union of South American Nations	12	America	
Member states of Mercosur	5	America	
Member states of the Bolivarian Alliance for the Americas	8	America	
Member states of the Caribbean Community	15	America	
Association of Caribbean States#Member states	25	America	
Caribbean Meteorological Organisation		America	
Inter-American Development Bank#Member states	48	America	
Member states of the African Union	55	Africa	9 observer states + 1 suspended
Southern African Development Community	14	Africa	
Member states of the Association of Southeast Asian Nations	11	Asia	
Member states of the Cooperation Council for the Arab States of the Gulf	6	Asia	
Member states of Shanghai Cooperation Organisation	6	Asia	+5 observers
United Nations Economic and Social Commission for Western Asia#Member states	14	Asia	
Economic Cooperation Organization#Member states	10	Asia	
Arctic Council#Member states	8	Arctic	13 observers

=== Other ===
- Member states of the Commonwealth of Independent States | 9 + 2 unofficial participants (Turkmenistan and Ukraine)

== Military ==
- Member states of NATO | 32

In history:

- Warsaw Pact § Members
- Central Powers § Member states

== See also ==
- Continental union
- Federated state
- State (country subdivision)
