= Member states of BRICS =

Membership and participation statuses of BRICS

As of June 2025: member states partner countries candidate states

The original members of BRICS were Brazil, Russia, India, and China, which began meeting as BRIC in 2006 and held their first leaders' summit in 2009. South Africa joined in 2010, giving the grouping its current acronym. BRICS expanded in 2024 with the admission of Egypt, Ethiopia, Iran, and the United Arab Emirates, and Indonesia formally joined in January 2025. Official BRICS sources also list Saudi Arabia among the member states, although its status has been described inconsistently (see Status of Saudi Arabia). In addition to its members, BRICS has a formal category of partner countries and uses several formats for engagement with other states and international organizations.

== Forms of affiliation and participation ==
BRICS is an informal intergovernmental coordination forum rather than a treaty-based international organization. It has no constitutive treaty, permanent secretariat or budget of its own. Official BRICS material distinguishes two standing categories of participation: member states and partner countries. Other forms of participation, including BRICS Outreach, BRICS Plus and invitations to external-engagement countries or international organizations, concern participation in particular meetings and do not constitute additional categories of membership.

Status or format	Nature	Participation
Member state	Standing BRICS participation category.	Members participate throughout the BRICS framework, and decisions among them are taken by consensus.
Partner country	Standing participation category created at the 16th BRICS summit in Kazan in 2024.	Partners are individually invited to the BRICS leaders' summit and meetings of foreign ministers. They may be invited to other meetings subject to consultation and consensus among the members, and may endorse summit declarations, foreign-ministers' declarations and other final documents.
BRICS Outreach	External-engagement meeting format, introduced by South Africa in 2013.	The rotating presidency may invite countries from its geographic region to participate in selected BRICS activities. Such participation does not itself confer member or partner status.
BRICS Plus	External-engagement meeting format, introduced by China in 2017.	The rotating presidency may invite countries from outside its geographic region to participate. Participation in BRICS Plus is not a separate membership category.
Other invited participants	Ad hoc participation in particular meetings.	States that are neither members nor partners, as well as international organizations, may be invited to specific meetings or summit sessions. An invitation to a meeting does not by itself create an affiliation status.
Applicant or interested country	No standing participation status.	A declaration of interest or application does not itself confer member or partner status. The official accession process distinguishes interested countries from potential members or partners, with final admission requiring consensus among the BRICS members.

=== Accession process ===
For full membership, official BRICS guidance describes three stages: an expression of interest, designation as a potential BRICS member and, following consensus among the members, admission as a member. A parallel process applies to partner-country status. Criteria considered for partners include geographic balance, good diplomatic relations with all BRICS members, United Nations membership and support for multilateralism and reform of global governance.

=== Status of Saudi Arabia ===
Saudi Arabia's status within BRICS has remained unresolved, with BRICS institutions and successive chair countries generally treating it as a member while Saudi official sources have repeatedly stopped short of unequivocally confirming its accession.

At the 15th BRICS summit in Johannesburg in August 2023, Saudi Arabia was one of six countries invited to become full members of BRICS from 1 January 2024. Egypt, Ethiopia, Iran and the United Arab Emirates subsequently began participating as members, while Argentina declined its invitation. Saudi Arabia, however, did not publicly confirm that it had accepted the invitation. In January 2024, Saudi Minister of Commerce Majid bin Abdullah Al Qasabi said that the kingdom had "not yet officially joined BRICS". The following month, a Saudi official source told press agencies that Saudi Arabia had "not yet responded to the invitation to join BRICS" and that the invitation remained under consideration.

Despite this, BRICS institutions began listing Saudi Arabia as a member. During Brazil's 2025 chairship, the official BRICS website described the group as comprising eleven members, explicitly including Saudi Arabia, and stated that the eleven member countries participated in BRICS meetings and consensus-based decision-making. Reuters nevertheless reported in May 2025 that Saudi Arabia had "held off formally joining" the group despite being listed as a member by BRICS itself.

Saudi official terminology has also varied between meetings. At the 17th BRICS summit in July 2025, the Saudi Press Agency (SPA) said that Minister of Foreign Affairs Faisal bin Farhan Al Saud headed the Saudi delegation "as an invited country to join the BRICS group". The inconsistency became particularly apparent during BRICS foreign ministers' meetings in New Delhi in May 2026. On 14 May, SPA reported that Saudi Arabia participated "in its capacity as a BRICS member country"; a report published by the same agency the following day described Saudi Arabia as participating "as an invited country".

The ambiguity was not resolved at the 18th BRICS summit in New Delhi in September 2026. As the 2026 BRICS chair, the Government of India explicitly classified Saudi Arabia as a full member. A government backgrounder published two days before the summit stated that "BRICS comprises 11 countries", including Saudi Arabia, and further stated that Saudi Arabia had become a full member in January 2024. Saudi Arabia nevertheless again used invited-country terminology. Foreign Minister Faisal bin Farhan travelled to New Delhi on behalf of Crown Prince and Prime Minister Mohammed bin Salman to head the Saudi delegation, while Saudi reporting described him as participating "as a representative of an invited country".

The summit programme provided a further indication of the distinction between Saudi Arabia's institutional classification and its participation. The programme released by India's Ministry of External Affairs reserved the opening day's principal events for leaders of BRICS member countries, including a members-only closed session beginning at 14:35 and subsequent events for member-country leaders. An official Indian diplomatic arrival list, however, gave Faisal bin Farhan Al Saud an estimated arrival time of 17:30 on 12 September, after the closed session and the other scheduled member-leader events. On the published timings, the Saudi delegation was therefore not scheduled to be present for the opening members-only programme. This does not by itself determine Saudi Arabia's formal BRICS status, particularly as the arrival list stated that its details were subject to change, but it added to the discrepancy between BRICS's classification of Saudi Arabia as a member and the more qualified manner in which the kingdom participated in the summit.

Independent reporting continued to distinguish Saudi Arabia from the ten states whose accession was regarded as completed. On 12 September 2026, Reuters described Saudi Arabia as having been invited to join BRICS but as having "yet to join".

As a result, Saudi Arabia has since 2024 occupied an unusual position within BRICS: official BRICS sources and successive chair countries have listed and treated it institutionally as a member, while Saudi authorities have not consistently confirmed accession and have repeatedly described the kingdom's participation as that of an invited country. The 2026 New Delhi summit did not resolve this discrepancy; instead, the host government continued to count Saudi Arabia among the eleven members while Saudi reporting and the published participation schedule remained consistent with a more qualified form of participation.

== Member states ==
Official BRICS sources and the Government of India, which holds the 2026 BRICS presidency, list eleven member states.

Country	Capital	Area (km^{2})	Population (2025)	Density (/km^{2})	GDP per cap. (PPP)	HDI	Currency	Official languages	Leaders	Accession
Brazil, Federative Republic of	Brasília	8,515,767	213,583,750	23.8	24,428	0.786	Brazilian real (R$) (BRL)	Portuguese also see Languages of Brazil	Head of State and Government: Luiz Inácio Lula da Silva	16 June 2009 (Informally, September 2006)
Russia; Russian Federation	Moscow	17,075,400	146,028,325	8.4	52,479	0.832	Russian rouble (₽) (RUB)	Russian also see Languages of Russia	Head of State: Vladimir Putin; Head of Government: Mikhail Mishustin	16 June 2009 (Informally, September 2006)
India, Republic of	New Delhi	3,287,240	1,417,492,000	430.7	12,801	0.685	Indian rupee (₹) (INR)	Hindi (Devanagari script); English; Also see Languages of India	Head of State: Droupadi Murmu; Head of Government: Narendra Modi	16 June 2009 (Informally, September 2006)
China, People's Republic of	Beijing	9,640,011 (Note: The actual area under PRC control is 9,596,960.)	1,408,280,000	147	31,596	0.797	Renminbi (Chinese yuan, ¥) (CNY)	Standard Chinese written in simplified characters see also languages of China	Party General Secretary and State Representative: Xi Jinping; Head of Government: Li Qiang	16 June 2009 (Informally, September 2006)
South Africa, Republic of	Pretoria (executive); Cape Town (legislative); Bloemfontein (judicial)	1,221,037	63,100,945	50.8	16,740	0.741	South African rand (R) (ZAR)	12 languages	Head of State and Government: Cyril Ramaphosa	24 December 2010
Egypt, Arab Republic of	Cairo	1,010,408	107,271,260	108.32	23,321	0.754	Egyptian pound (LE) (EGP)	Arabic	Head of State: Abdel Fattah el-Sisi; Head of Government: Mostafa Madbouly	1 January 2024
Ethiopia, Federal Democratic Republic of	Addis Ababa	1,104,300	109,499,000	92.7	4,974	0.497	Ethiopian birr (Br) (ETB)	Afar; Amharic; Oromo; Somali; Tigrinya	Head of State: Taye Atske Selassie; Head of Government: Abiy Ahmed	1 January 2024
Iran, Islamic Republic of	Tehran	1,648,195	92,417,681	52	20,279	0.799	Iranian rial (Rl) (IRR)	Persian	Head of State: Mojtaba Khamenei; Head of Government: Masoud Pezeshkian	1 January 2024
United Arab Emirates	Abu Dhabi	83,600	11,027,129	132	87,774	0.940	UAE dirham (AED)	Arabic	Head of State: Mohamed bin Zayed Al Nahyan; Head of Government: Mohammed bin Rashid Al Maktoum	1 January 2024
Indonesia, Republic of	Jakarta	1,904,569	284,438,782	143	18,973	0.728	Indonesian rupiah (Rp) (IDR)	Indonesian	Head of State and Government: Prabowo Subianto	6 January 2025

=== Disputed member ===
Country	Capital	Area (km^{2})	Population (2025)	Density (/km^{2})	GDP per cap. (PPP)	HDI	Currency	Official languages	Leaders	Accession
Saudi Arabia, Kingdom of	Riyadh	2,149,690	34,566,328	16.1	78,815	0.900	Saudi riyal (ر.س) (SAR)	Arabic	Head of State: Salman of Saudi Arabia; Head of Government: Mohammed bin Salman	Invited to join from 1 January 2024 (Note: Saudi Arabia's BRICS membership is disputed. Official BRICS sources list Saudi Arabia as a BRICS member, while the country maintains ambiguity regarding its status. See Status of Saudi Arabia for discussion of its status.)

== Partner countries ==
The partner-country category was created at the 16th BRICS summit in Kazan in 2024. It is a formal participation category distinct from full membership and should not be confused with observer status. Belarus, Bolivia, Cuba, Kazakhstan, Malaysia, Nigeria, Thailand, Uganda and Uzbekistan became the first BRICS partner countries in January 2025. Vietnam was formally admitted on 13 June 2025, becoming the tenth partner country.

Country	Capital	Area (km^{2})	Population	Density (/km^{2})	GDP per cap. (PPP)	HDI	Currency	Official languages	Leaders	Partner since
Belarus, Republic of	Minsk	207,595	9,498,700	45.8	35,616	0.824	Belarusian ruble (BYN)	Belarusian; Russian	Head of State: Alexander Lukashenko; Head of Government: Alexander Turchin	1 January 2025
Bolivia, Plurinational State of	Sucre	1,098,581	12,186,079	10.4	12,692	0.733	Boliviano (BOB)	Spanish; Quechua; Aymara; Guarani; Other Indigenous languages	Head of State and Government: Rodrigo Paz	1 January 2025
Cuba, Republic of	Havana	109,884	10,985,974	101.8	22,237	0.762	Cuban peso (CUP)	Spanish	Party First Secretary and Head of State: Miguel Díaz-Canel; Head of Government: Manuel Marrero Cruz	1 January 2025
Kazakhstan, Republic of	Astana	2,724,900	20,075,271	7	48,250	0.837	Tenge (KZT)	Kazakh; Russian	Head of State: Kassym-Jomart Tokayev; Head of Government: Oljas Bektenov	1 January 2025
Malaysia	Kuala Lumpur	330,803	34,564,803	101	46,986	0.819	Malaysian ringgit (MYR)	Malay	Head of State: Ibrahim Iskandar; Head of Government: Anwar Ibrahim	1 January 2025
Nigeria, Federal Republic of	Abuja	923,769	220,159,000	237	9,994	0.560	Nigerian naira (NGN)	English	Head of State and Government: Bola Tinubu	January 2025
Thailand, Kingdom of	Bangkok	513,120	65,975,198	132.1	27,441	0.798	Thai baht (THB)	Thai	Head of State: Vajiralongkorn; Head of Government: Anutin Charnvirakul	1 January 2025
Uganda, Republic of	Kampala	241,038	49,283,041	157.1	4,192	0.582	Ugandan shilling (UGX)	English; Swahili	Head of State: Yoweri Museveni; Head of Government: Robinah Nabbanja	1 January 2025
Uzbekistan, Republic of	Tashkent	447,400	37,535,605	80.2	14,179	0.740	Uzbek sum (UZS)	Uzbek	Head of State: Shavkat Mirziyoyev; Head of Government: Abdulla Aripov	1 January 2025
Vietnam, Socialist Republic of	Hanoi	331,344.82	100,300,000	298	19,649	0.766	Vietnamese đồng (VND)	Vietnamese	Party General Secretary and Head of State: Tô Lâm; Head of Government: Lê Minh Hưng (Note: The General Secretary of the Communist Party of Vietnam is the leading position in the Communist Party of Vietnam.)	13 June 2025

=== Other partner-country invitations and expressions of interest ===
BRICS has considered a larger group of states for partner-country status than the ten countries that have formally become partners. Official BRICS material states that more than 30 countries expressed interest in participation as members or partners during the 2024 expansion process. An invitation or expression of interest should therefore not be treated as equivalent to partner status.

Country	Reported position	Status
Turkey, Republic of	Turkish Trade Minister Ömer Bolat said in November 2024 that BRICS had offered Turkey partner-country status.	Turkey is not included in the current official list of BRICS partner countries.
Algeria, People's Democratic Republic of	Algeria was among countries that had expressed interest in BRICS participation. In September 2024, Algerian state media reported that the authorities considered the country's full-membership accession file closed.	Algeria is not a BRICS member or partner.

== Applications and prospective expansion ==
An application or expression of interest does not constitute a BRICS affiliation status. Under the procedures described by BRICS, applications are considered through consultations before leaders decide by consensus whether to invite a country to become a member or partner.

=== Current publicly confirmed applications for full membership ===
Country	Application	Current position
Azerbaijan, Republic of	August 2024	Azerbaijan formally applied for BRICS membership. It is not currently listed as a member or partner.
Pakistan, Islamic Republic of	2023	Pakistan has publicly maintained its interest in full membership. In July 2025, its Foreign Ministry stated that Pakistan remained interested in becoming a BRICS member. It is not currently a member or partner.
Palestine, State of	2025	The Palestinian ambassador to Russia stated in September 2025 that Palestine had submitted an application for full membership and had not yet received a response. Palestine is not currently a member or partner.

=== Former full-membership applications ===
Country	Application	Outcome
Argentina, Republic of	2022	Argentina was invited in 2023 to become a member from 1 January 2024, but the government of Javier Milei declined the invitation in December 2023.
Algeria, People's Democratic Republic of	2023	Algerian authorities later considered the accession file closed, according to Algerian state media in September 2024.

=== Unsuccessful or unresolved partner-country bids ===
During the 2024 process for selecting the first partner countries, a number of additional states expressed interest but did not obtain partner status. Reporting at the 16th BRICS summit stated that Brazil opposed the inclusion of Venezuela among the proposed partners. Nicaragua was also discussed as a possible partner but was not selected. Neither country is currently a BRICS partner.

== Membership in other international groupings ==
The following table compares BRICS member states' full membership in selected international groupings. It does not generally include observer, dialogue-partner or other non-membership statuses; cooperation through OPEC+ is indicated separately.

Membership in selected international groupings
Country	P5	G20	SCO	RCEP	APEC	G4	OPEC	Nuclear-armed state	AU	AL	G15	G24	G8+5
Brazil	No	Yes	No	No	No	Yes	OPEC+	No	No	No	Yes	Yes	Yes
Russia	Yes	Yes	Yes	No	Yes	No	OPEC+	Yes	No	No	No	No	Yes
India	No	Yes	Yes	No	No	Yes	No	Yes	No	No	Yes	Yes	Yes
China	Yes	Yes	Yes	Yes	Yes	No	No	Yes	No	No	No	Yes	Yes
South Africa	No	Yes	No	No	No	No	No	No	Yes	No	No	Yes	Yes
Egypt	No	No	No	No	No	No	No	No	Yes	Yes	Yes	Yes	No
Ethiopia	No	No	No	No	No	No	No	No	Yes	No	No	Yes	No
Iran	No	No	Yes	No	No	No	Yes	No	No	No	Yes	Yes	No
United Arab Emirates	No	No	No	No	No	No	No	No	No	Yes	No	No	No
Indonesia	No	Yes	No	Yes	Yes	No	No	No	No	No	Yes	No	No

== See also ==
- BRICS summits
- New Development Bank
- Member states of ASEAN
- Member states of the Shanghai Cooperation Organisation
- Member states of the Eurasian Economic Union
- Member states of Mercosur
- Member states of NATO
