= Trinidad and Tobago and CARICOM =

Trinidad and Tobago-CARICOM
- Membership: Full member
- Since: 1973
- Membership: Full member

The nation of Trinidad and Tobago has been the leading supporter of the Caribbean Community (CARICOM). Trinidad and Tobago was one of the four members in 1973 which then along with Barbados, Guyana and Antigua and Barbuda moved to establish the organisation that today it known as the Caribbean Community and Common Market. The new organisation because a successor to the Caribbean Free Trade Association (CARIFTA) by the Treaty of Chaguaramas, of which Trinidad and Tobago was a leading member and also a founding member.

Several Organisations of the CARICOM organisation are physically based in Trinidad and Tobago including:

- Caribbean Court of Justice (CCJ)
- Caribbean Association of Judicial Officers (CAJO)
- CARICOM Implementing Agency for Crime and Security (IMPACS)

For its own purposes, the CARICOM organisation classifies its members as either More Developed Countries or Less Developed countries. Trinidad and Tobago is classified as fitting into More Developed Country.

In February 2003 the Government of Trinidad and Tobago took a decision to establish the CARICOM Trade Support (CTS) Programme. Partly crafted by Mr. Kenneth Valley, Trinidad and Tobago's Minister of Trade, the CTS Programme provides loans to finance business development projects in order to help CARICOM States improve their trade capacity, enhance the performance of their individual economies and to strengthen the competitiveness among private sector firms. Loans are provided on an interest-free basis and must be used for the purposes of procuring technical assistance services which are to be delivered by consultants. The Programme was launched on October 29, 2004, with a revolving fund loan in the amount of TT$100 million to be disbursed on an interest free basis to firms in CARICOM, except those located in Trinidad and Tobago. The TT$100 million (US$16 million or J$1 billion (at the 2004 exchange rate)) loan facility is just one component of the programme however. Other components of the trade support programme include the facilitation of investment by firms from Trinidad and Tobago in CARICOM member-states through joint ventures and strategic alliances; as well as the provision of technical inputs from national and regional private sector umbrella bodies. Administered by Trinidad and Tobago's Ministry of Trade and Industry the programme has already approved loans for private sector firm in St. Kitts & Nevis, Antigua & Barbuda, Grenada, and more recently in Suriname (the Sunspot company) and Jamaica (for the Pulse Investment Company Ltd.). The latter two companies received loans totalling US$180,000 for the purposes of restructuring to ensure enhanced profitability and to develop an export marketing programme. Loans, in amounts ranging from US$6,000 to US$100,000, approved under the CTS programme will be disbursed by the Royal Bank of Trinidad and Tobago (RBTT) and the bank will also be responsible for administering loan repayments and the securitization of loan funds.

Since at least 2007, in addition to the interest-free loans for the utilization of consultants in business development projects, the CTS programme has also been offering loans at market rates for plant, equipment and inventory through financial institutions like the RBTT and EXIM Bank of the United States.

In July 2004, the Government of Trinidad and Tobago also took a decision to establish a CARICOM Petroleum Stabilization Fund as a grant facility capitalized at a maximum of TT$25 million per month based on a CARICOM partner country's purchase of petroleum from Petrotrin. It was officially established in 2006 and is aimed at supporting poverty eradication projects and is administered by the Caribbean Development Bank. Prior to its official establishment, one of the earliest utilizations of the Fund was in the form of a TT$150 million bailout of LIAT (of which the government of Trinidad and Tobago is a shareholder) to assist in its restructuring plans in January 2005. This bailout was agreed to by the Trinidad and Tobago Cabinet and approved by the CARICOM Heads of Government. As the Fund had not been officially established under Section 43 of the Exchequer and Audit Act, the necessary funds were appropriated by Parliament in the Ministry of Energy and Energy Industries as part of its overall allocation. The Trinidad and Tobago Cabinet approved the used of the funds, as at the time it was not prepared to support either BWIA or LIAT in their present form and stressed that the CARICOM member states should move with dispatch to ensure the restructuring of the airlines and the establishment of a regional carrier

By the end of December 2006, TT$750 million (US$125 million) of grant funds had been disbursed from the Petroleum Fund. In 2009 the Fund amounted to US$79 million (TT$502.6) million. Among the projects funded by the Petroleum Stabilization Fund (PSF) in 2009 was a 10-day search and rescue course conducted by the Montserrat Institute of Disaster Research Education and Management for Community Emergency Response Teams. Students from the course came from Saint Kitts and Nevis, the Cayman Islands, Saint Lucia, Dominica and Montserrat with fourteen Montserratians participating in order to strengthen their island's capacity to cope with hazards, including its ongoing volcanic threat. In December 2009, the Manning administration offered ready and willing support to Jamaica from the PSF in the event that more money was needed to meet the requirements for a loan from the International Monetary Fund. Energy Minister Conrad Enill said that although Trinidad and Tobago itself is facing a $7 billion deficit, any assistance for Jamaica was already available by way of the PSF if it wanted any short term help to raise J$21.8 billion (TT$1.53 billion) needed to meet the requirements for the IMF loan.

At the July 2010 meeting of the CARICOM Heads of Government in Montego Bay, Jamaica, Prime Minister of Trinidad and Tobago, Mrs. Persad-Bissessar expressed her government's firm commitment to the fund but argued for greater accountability as to how the funds are being used so that the resources spent are allocated in accordance with what are the most urgent areas of need in the region. She cited a range of issues that the fund could target, including in education, the development of a sustained regional environment initiative and the fostering of regional scheme similar to Trinidad and Tobago's Children's Life Fund which provides money for surgeries for children. By the end of 2011, US$260 million had been provided in assistance through the PSF.

In January 2015, at the first First Caribbean Energy Security Summit in Washington, DC, Trinidad and Tobago's Prime Minister Kamla Persad-Bissessar proposed a US$1 billion Caribbean Energy Thematic Fund. Persad-Bissessar note that after 18 months of rigour analysis and feasibility studies in close coordination with the Inter-American Development Bank (IDB), her government had agreed on the creation of this fund for Caricom member states to build resilience, competitiveness and energy security via transformation of the energy landscape in the region. This transformation would be brought about by (i) maximizing the use of renewable energy sources; (ii) Improving energy efficiency and conservation; and (iii) converting the base load capacity of the region towards Liquefied Natural Gas-fueled electricity generation. The proposed fund would be capitalized and administered in conjunction with the Inter-American Development Bank (IADB), the Caribbean Development Bank (CDB), the World Bank, IMF, other international donors, and the private sector. Later in February 2015, T&T's Minister of Planning and Development Dr Bhoe Tewarie, clarified that Trinidad & Tobago would only be participating in the proposed fund if it makes sense to do so and if there was going to be return on the investment into region's long term energy security and needs. He added that the level of Trinidad and Tobago's participation would also depend on the willingness and commitment of the Inter-American Development Bank and other contributing donors. He noted that the proposal was well received by other Caricom representatives at the First Caribbean Energy Security Summit in Washington, DC and that his government was committed to establishing the fund.

On 12, March 2010 Trinidad and Tobago signed the CARIPASS treaty, so the CARIPASS is a voluntary travel card programme that provide a simple border crossings to other CARICOM nations.
