= Member states of the International Atomic Energy Agency =

Member states Observer states Withdrew membership Non-members

The member states of the International Atomic Energy Agency (IAEA) are those states which have joined the international organization that seeks to promote the peaceful use of nuclear energy, and to inhibit its use for any military purpose, including nuclear weapons. The IAEA was established as an autonomous organization on 29 July 1957. Though established independently of the United Nations through its own international treaty, the IAEA Statute, the IAEA reports to both the UN General Assembly and Security Council. During 1956, an IAEA Statute Conference was held to draft the founding documents for the IAEA, and the IAEA Statute was completed at a conference in 1957.

== List of member states ==
As of September 2026, the IAEA has 182 member states. Most UN members and the Holy See are member states of the IAEA. The dates of membership are listed below.

| State | Date of ratification |
|---|---|
| Afghanistan | 31 May 1957 |
| Albania | 23 August 1957 |
| Algeria | 24 December 1963 |
| Angola | 9 November 1999 |
| Antigua and Barbuda | 14 October 2015 |
| Argentina | 3 October 1957 |
| Armenia | 27 September 1993 |
| Australia | 29 July 1957 |
| Austria | 10 May 1957 |
| Azerbaijan | 30 May 2001 |
| Bahamas | 7 January 2014 |
| Bahrain | 23 June 2009 |
| Bangladesh | 27 September 1972 |
| Barbados | 20 November 2015 |
| Belarus | 8 April 1957 |
| Belgium | 29 April 1958 |
| Belize | 31 March 2006 |
| Benin | 26 May 1999 |
| Bolivia | 15 March 1963 |
| Bosnia and Herzegovina | 19 September 1995 |
| Botswana | 20 March 2002 |
| Brazil | 29 July 1957 |
| Brunei | 18 February 2014 |
| Bulgaria | 17 August 1957 |
| Burkina Faso | 14 September 1998 |
| Burundi | 24 June 2009 |
| Cambodia | 23 November 2009 (Note: Originally joined on 6 February 1958 but withdrew on 26 March 2003.) |
| Cameroon | 13 July 1964 |
| Canada | 29 July 1957 |
| Cape Verde | 4 April 2023 |
| Central African Republic | 5 January 2001 |
| Chad | 2 November 2005 |
| Chile | 19 September 1960 |
| China (Note: Joined as the Republic of China (Taiwan), which is currently only recognized by 11 UN member states, on 10 September 1957. However, the United Nations General Assembly vote to transfer China's seat to the People's Republic of China (PRC) in 1971, after which China ceased to be a member of the IAEA until the PRC joined on 1 January 1984.) | 1 January 1984 |
| Colombia | 30 September 1960 |
| Comoros | 17 September 2020 |
| Cook Islands | 17 October 2024 |
| Republic of the Congo | 15 July 2009 |
| Costa Rica | 25 March 1965 |
| Cote d'Ivoire | 19 November 1963 |
| Croatia | 12 February 1993 |
| Cuba | 1 October 1957 |
| Cyprus | 7 June 1965 |
| Czech Republic | 27 September 1993 |
| Democratic Republic of the Congo | 10 October 1961 |
| Denmark | 16 July 1957 |
| Djibouti | 6 March 2015 |
| Dominica | 17 February 2012 |
| Dominican Republic | 11 July 1957 |
| Ecuador | 3 March 1958 |
| Egypt | 4 September 1957 |
| El Salvador | 22 November 1957 |
| Eritrea | 20 December 2002 |
| Estonia | 31 January 1992 |
| Eswatini (Note: As Swaziland until 2018.) | 15 February 2013 |
| Ethiopia | 30 September 1957 |
| Fiji | 2 November 2012 |
| Finland | 7 January 1958 |
| France | 29 July 1957 |
| Gabon | 21 January 1964 |
| Gambia | 3 January 2023 |
| Georgia | 23 February 1996 |
| Germany (Note: Joined as West Germany. East Germany was also a member of the IAEA prior to German reunification.) | 1 October 1957 |
| Ghana | 28 September 1960 |
| Greece | 30 September 1957 |
| Grenada | 30 April 2018 |
| Guatemala | 29 March 1957 |
| Guinea | 19 September 2023 |
| Guyana | 27 January 2015 |
| Haiti | 7 October 1957 |
| Holy See | 20 August 1957 |
| Honduras | 24 February 2003 (Note: Originally joined on 9 July 1957 but withdrew on 19 June 1967.) |
| Hungary | 8 August 1957 |
| Iceland | 6 August 1957 |
| India | 16 July 1957 |
| Indonesia | 7 August 1957 |
| Iran | 16 September 1958 |
| Iraq | 4 March 1959 |
| Ireland | 6 January 1970 |
| Israel | 12 July 1957 |
| Italy | 30 September 1957 |
| Jamaica | 29 December 1965 |
| Japan | 16 July 1957 |
| Jordan | 18 April 1966 |
| Kazakhstan | 14 February 1994 |
| Kenya | 12 July 1965 |
| South Korea | 8 August 1957 |
| Kuwait | 1 December 1964 |
| Kyrgyzstan | 10 September 2003 |
| Laos | 4 November 2011 |
| Latvia | 10 April 1997 |
| Lebanon | 29 June 1961 |
| Lesotho | 13 July 2009 |
| Liberia | 5 October 1962 |
| Libya | 9 September 1963 |
| Liechtenstein | 13 December 1968 |
| Lithuania | 18 November 1993 |
| Luxembourg | 29 January 1958 |
| Madagascar | 22 March 1965 |
| Malawi | 2 October 2006 |
| Malaysia | 15 January 1969 |
| Maldives | 4 December 2025 |
| Mali | 10 August 1961 |
| Malta | 29 September 1997 |
| Marshall Islands | 26 January 1994 |
| Mauritania | 23 November 2004 |
| Mauritius | 31 December 1974 |
| Mexico | 7 April 1958 |
| Moldova | 24 September 1997 |
| Monaco | 19 September 1957 |
| Mongolia | 20 September 1973 |
| Montenegro | 30 October 2006 |
| Morocco | 17 September 1957 |
| Mozambique | 18 September 2006 |
| Myanmar | 18 October 1957 |
| Namibia | 17 February 1983 |
| Nepal | 8 July 2008 |
| Netherlands | 30 July 1957 |
| New Zealand | 13 September 1957 |
| Nicaragua | 25 March 1977 (Note: Originally joined on 17 September 1957 but withdrew on 14 December 1970.) |
| Niger | 27 March 1969 |
| Nigeria | 25 March 1964 |
| North Macedonia (Note: Listed under the provisional designation "The former Yugoslav Republic of Macedonia" until 2019.) | 25 February 1994 |
| Norway | 10 June 1957 |
| Oman | 5 February 2009 |
| Pakistan | 2 May 1957 |
| Palau | 2 March 2007 |
| Panama | 2 March 1966 |
| Papua New Guinea | 4 April 2012 |
| Paraguay | 30 September 1957 |
| Peru | 30 September 1957 |
| Philippines | 2 September 1958 |
| Poland | 31 July 1957 |
| Portugal | 12 July 1957 |
| Qatar | 27 February 1976 |
| Romania | 12 April 1957 |
| Russia | 8 April 1957 |
| Rwanda | 4 September 2012 |
| Saint Kitts and Nevis | 9 February 2022 |
| Saint Lucia | 5 February 2019 |
| Saint Vincent and the Grenadines | 4 December 2017 |
| Samoa | 7 April 2021 |
| San Marino | 25 November 2013 |
| Saudi Arabia | 13 December 1962 |
| Senegal | 1 November 1960 |
| Serbia | 31 October 2001 |
| Seychelles | 22 April 2003 |
| Sierra Leone | 4 June 1967 |
| Singapore | 5 January 1967 |
| Slovakia | 27 September 1993 |
| Slovenia | 21 September 1992 |
| Somalia | 15 November 2024 |
| South Africa | 6 June 1957 |
| Spain | 26 August 1957 |
| Sri Lanka | 22 August 1957 |
| Sudan | 17 July 1958 |
| Sweden | 19 June 1957 |
| Switzerland | 5 April 1957 |
| Syria | 6 June 1963 |
| Tajikistan | 10 September 2001 |
| Tanzania | 6 January 1976 |
| Thailand | 15 October 1957 |
| Timor-Leste | 21 September 2026 |
| Togo | 1 November 2012 |
| Tonga | 2 March 2022 |
| Trinidad and Tobago | 9 November 2012 |
| Tunisia | 14 October 1957 |
| Turkey | 19 July 1957 |
| Turkmenistan | 16 February 2016 |
| Uganda | 30 August 1967 |
| Ukraine | 31 July 1957 |
| United Arab Emirates | 15 January 1976 |
| United Kingdom | 29 July 1957 |
| United States of America | 29 July 1957 |
| Uruguay | 22 January 1963 |
| Uzbekistan | 26 January 1994 |
| Vanuatu | 9 September 2015 |
| Venezuela | 19 August 1957 |
| Vietnam | 24 September 1957 |
| Yemen | 14 October 1994 |
| Zambia | 8 January 1969 |
| Zimbabwe | 1 August 1986 |

== Non-member states ==
=== Former member state ===
Four states have withdrawn from the IAEA at some point in the past, but three of them have since rejoined the IAEA. North Korea became a member in 1974, but withdrew in 1994 after the Board of Governors found it in non-compliance with its safeguards agreement and suspended most technical cooperation. Nicaragua became a member in 1957, withdrew its membership in 1970, and rejoined in 1977, Honduras joined in 1957, withdrew in 1967, and rejoined in 2003, while Cambodia joined in 1958, withdrew in 2003, and rejoined in 2009.

| State | Date of membership | Date of withdrawal of membership |
|---|---|---|
| North Korea | 18 September 1974 | 13 June 1994 |

=== Observer state ===
The IAEA also has one observer state, the State of Palestine.

| State | Date of observer status |
|---|---|
| State of Palestine | 28 September 2023 (Note: Palestine Liberation Organization originally granted observer status by the IAEA on 23 September 1976. Designation changed to "Palestine" on 29 September 1989, and "State of Palestine" on 28 September 2023.) |

=== Other states ===
The remaining 12 UN member states that, as of 2026, have no relationship with the IAEA are:

- Andorra
- Bhutan
- Equatorial Guinea
- Guinea-Bissau
- Kiribati
- Micronesia
- Nauru
- São Tomé and Príncipe
- Solomon Islands
- South Sudan
- Suriname
- Tuvalu
