= Caribbean Association of Judicial Officers =

The Caribbean Association of Judicial Officers (CAJO) is a Caribbean association of judicial officers. Members include the region's chief justices, judges, magistrates, masters, tribunal members, registrars, executive court administrators and many other judicial officers as defined in the draft constitution of the organization. It counts among its members some of the most prominent Caribbean jurists.

== History ==
The Caribbean Court of Justice and the Judiciary of the Republic of Trinidad and Tobago were the co-hosts of the inaugural conference.

An initial Steering Committee has been tasked with drafting the constitution of the organization.

CAJO is to be headquartered in Port of Spain, Trinidad and Tobago, and had its inaugural conference on 25, 26 and 27 June 2009 at the Hyatt Regency Trinidad there. Sir Shridath Ramphal delivered the feature address, in which he said it was time for the Privy Council of the United Kingdom to be replaced as the final court of appeal by the Caribbean Court of Justice.
