= Member states of Mercosur =

Member states Associated states Suspended member

Currently, Mercosur is composed of six full members (one of which is suspended), seven associated countries and two observer countries:

== Member states ==
| Arms | Flag | State | Capital | Area | Population (2021) | Population density | HDI (2023) | Accession |
|---|---|---|---|---|---|---|---|---|
| | Flag of Argentina | Argentina | Buenos Aires | 2,766,890 km^{2} (1,068,300 sq mi) | 45,276,780 | 16.03/km^{2} (41.5/sq mi) | 0.865 | 26 March 1991 |
| | Flag of Bolivia | Bolivia | La Paz, Sucre (Note: La Paz is the administrative capital of Bolivia; Sucre is the judicial seat and legal capital as stated in the constitution.) | 1,098,580 km^{2} (424,160 sq mi) | 12,079,472 | 10.3/km^{2} (27/sq mi) | 0.733 | 8 July 2024 |
| | Flag of Brazil | Brazil | Brasília | 8,514,877 km^{2} (3,287,612 sq mi) | 214,326,223 | 24.6/km^{2} (64/sq mi) | 0.786 | 26 March 1991 |
| | Flag of Paraguay | Paraguay | Asunción | 406,750 km^{2} (157,050 sq mi) | 6,703,799 | 17.1/km^{2} (44/sq mi) | 0.756 | 26 March 1991 |
| | Flag of Uruguay | Uruguay | Montevideo | 176,220 km^{2} (68,040 sq mi) | 3,426,260 | 19.57/km^{2} (50.7/sq mi) | 0.862 | 26 March 1991 |
| | Flag of Venezuela | Venezuela (suspended) (Note: Associate state (2004), Protocol of Accession (2006), full membership (2012), suspended (1 December 2016).) | Caracas | 916,445 km^{2} (353,841 sq mi) | 28,199,867 | 31.52/km^{2} (81.6/sq mi) | 0.709 | 31 July 2012 |
| Total | | | | 12,963,317 km^{2} (5,005,165 sq mi) | 281,812,534 | 21.74/km^{2} (56.3/sq mi) | 0.785 | |

=== Bolivia ===
Bolivia's full participation in the Mercosur bloc was under negotiation from June 2011 until 2024. In December 2012, Bolivia signed an accession protocol to become a full member. Joining required all members states to ratify the procotol. Uruguay ratified the agreement in June 2014. In September 2014, Argentina approved Bolivia's entry, leaving only Brazil and Paraguay to approve the agreement. Due to objections from Paraguay that the protocol was agreed to while it was under suspension from the organization, an amended protocol was agreed to in 2015. Brazil ratified the agreement in December 2023, the final Mercosur member to do so. That left only Bolivia's internal ratification process to be completed before it became a full member, which came to fruition in July 2024.

=== Venezuela ===
Venezuela applied for membership, but its entry has not been ratified by Paraguay, although it was ratified by Argentina, Brazil and Uruguay. However, in June 2012 Paraguay was suspended from Mercosur for an alleged coup d'état and the violation of the Democratic Clause of Mercosur, so Venezuela's admission, already approved by the remaining members, became effective on 31 July. Venezuela is considered a key member of the Mercosur due to its energy resources, including natural gas and oil. Venezuela is also an important economic market for Brazil because of a favorable balance of trade.

==== Ratification process in Brazil ====
The process was approved by the Brazilian Government, the Chamber of Deputies and the Senate. In May 2007, the Brazilian Senate asked Venezuela to reconsider the non-renewal of RCTV's license, an oppositionist television network. Venezuelan president Hugo Chávez responded by accusing the Brazilian Congress of being subservient to interests of the United States. The leader of the Brazilian Social Democracy Party in the Senate, senator Arthur Virgílio, stated that the party would try to prevent Venezuela's entry in Mercosur. On 18 December 2008, the Brazilian Chamber of Deputies approved by 265 votes, 61 against and 6 abstentions, Venezuela's bid for membership in Mercosur. The bill was forwarded to the Brazilian Senate, where it was still pending as of 31 May 2009, though Brazilian President Luiz Inácio Lula da Silva said he expected final approval by September. However, some members of the Senate condemned Hugo Chávez's alleged attacks on freedom of the press and expression in Venezuela. One senator, Flexa Ribeiro, said, "The Brazilian Senate needs to send a strong message in support of the reestablishment of full democracy in Venezuela." The decision could further delay Venezuela's entry into Mercosur.

In September 2009, President Luiz Inácio Lula da Silva said that he was confident the Senate would approve the entry of Venezuela and added that "There is no Senate opposition to the entry of Venezuela into Mercosur. What exists is a natural process of discussion by the senators who want to evaluate the pros and cons of the enlargement of Mercosur with Venezuela's entry." According to Lula, the expansion of the organisation will especially benefit the northern states of Brazil. The ambassador of Brazil in Caracas, Antonio Simões was called to Brasília to meet with 81 senators and explain the benefits of Venezuela's entry into Mercosur for Brazil. On 15 December 2009, the Brazilian Senate ratified Venezuela's entry into Mercosur.

==== Ratification process in Paraguay ====
The government of Paraguay supports Venezuela's entry into Mercosur, but this process is complicated by opposition from the right-wing Colorado Party. The party had ruled Paraguay for 61 years until 2008 and still controls Paraguay's Upper House, whose support is needed to pass the bill. On 4 March 2009, the External Relations Commission of the Paraguayan Chamber of Senators could not approve a recommendation for Venezuela's bid for membership in Mercosur. The bill was later withdrawn by the Paraguayan government after it feared defeat in the Congress, after several legislators questioned Hugo Chávez's "commitment to democracy" following the closure of several media outlets in Venezuela. President Lugo called on Congress to avoid “prejudices” and not limit a country of millions of souls “to a single name”, after a June 2010 political agreement between the President's coalition and the Colorado party that renewed speakers at the Senate and the Lower House. The Paraguayan Senate's block on Venezuela's membership was circumvented in June 2012, when the country was suspended from Mercosur for an alleged coup d'état and the violation of the Democratic Clause of Mercosur, so the admission of Venezuela (already approved by the other legislatures of Mercosur) became effective in July 2012.

==== Venezuela's membership in dispute ====
In August 2016, the presidents of Brazil, Argentina and Paraguay, while present in Rio de Janeiro for the Olympic Games, met to discuss suspending Venezuela from Mercosur. The three countries are in doubt about whether Venezuela is complying with the union's requirements for full membership, citing Human Rights violations among other issues. Moreover, Venezuela was rejected from assuming the presidency of Mercosur by those three countries. Venezuela had four years to fully adapt to the trade bloc regulations and failed to do so, with the nation being suspended from Mercosur on 1 December 2016.

==== Later developments ====
On 5 August 2017, the foreign ministers of Argentina, Paraguay, Uruguay and Brazil affirmed that Venezuela's membership of Mercosur is suspended indefinitely in response to the "rupture of the democratic order" in that country following the 30 July 2017 Constituent Assembly elections. The bloc by-laws have no provision for expulsion. However, trade and migration policies stay without changes to avoid aggravating the social crisis. Brazilian Foreign Minister Aloysio Nunes said that Venezuela will remain suspended until the country "re-establishes democracy."

In January 2019, the opposition-majority National Assembly declared incumbent Nicolás Maduro's 2018 reelection invalid, entering a presidential crisis. During a July 2019 summit in Santa Fe, Argentina, the bloc called for "free, fair and transparent presidential elections, as soon as possible" in Venezuela. The presidents of the four member countries signed a statement expressing concern "for the grave crisis that Venezuela is going through, which is seriously affecting the humanitarian situation and human rights."

== Associated states ==
| Arms | Flag | State | Capital | Area | Population (2021) | Population density | HDI (2024) | Accession |
|---|---|---|---|---|---|---|---|---|
| | Flag of Chile | Chile | Santiago | 756,950 km^{2} (292,260 sq mi) | 19,493,184 | 24.74/km^{2} (64.1/sq mi) | 0.878 | 25 June 1996 |
| | Flag of Colombia | Colombia | Bogotá | 1,141,748 km^{2} (440,831 sq mi) | 51,516,562 | 43.49/km^{2} (112.6/sq mi) | 0.788 | 17 December 2004 |
| | Flag of Ecuador | Ecuador | Quito | 283,560 km^{2} (109,480 sq mi) | 17,797,737 | 60.24/km^{2} (156.0/sq mi) | 0.777 | 16 December 2004 |
| | Flag of Guyana | Guyana | Georgetown | 214,999 km^{2} (83,012 sq mi) | 804,567 | 3.62/km^{2} (9.4/sq mi) | 0.776 | 12 July 2013 |
| | Flag of Panama | Panama | Panama City | 75,417 km^{2} (29,119 sq mi) | 4,351,267 | 56/km^{2} (150/sq mi) | 0.839 | 7 December 2024 |
| | Flag of Peru | Peru | Lima | 1,285,220 km^{2} (496,230 sq mi) | 33,715,471 | 24.89/km^{2} (64.5/sq mi) | 0.794 | 17 December 2003 |
| | Flag of Suriname | Suriname | Paramaribo | 163,270 km^{2} (63,040 sq mi) | 612,985 | 3.52/km^{2} (9.1/sq mi) | 0.722 | 12 July 2013 |

Guyana and Suriname signed framework agreements with Mercosur in July 2013 to become associate states.

== Observer states ==
- New Zealand
- Mexico

== Potential member states ==
=== Ecuador ===
Ecuador has expressed interest in joining Mercosur, and started negotiations to join in May 2013.

However, its membership in the Andean Community of Nations complicates such attempts.

=== Peru ===
Peru's president Humala said in 2011 that Peru may be interested in joining in the future, but that the country was not yet ready to start the process due to economic reasons.
