= Mapire, Peninsula de Paria =

Town in Sucre, Venezuela

Mapire
- Town
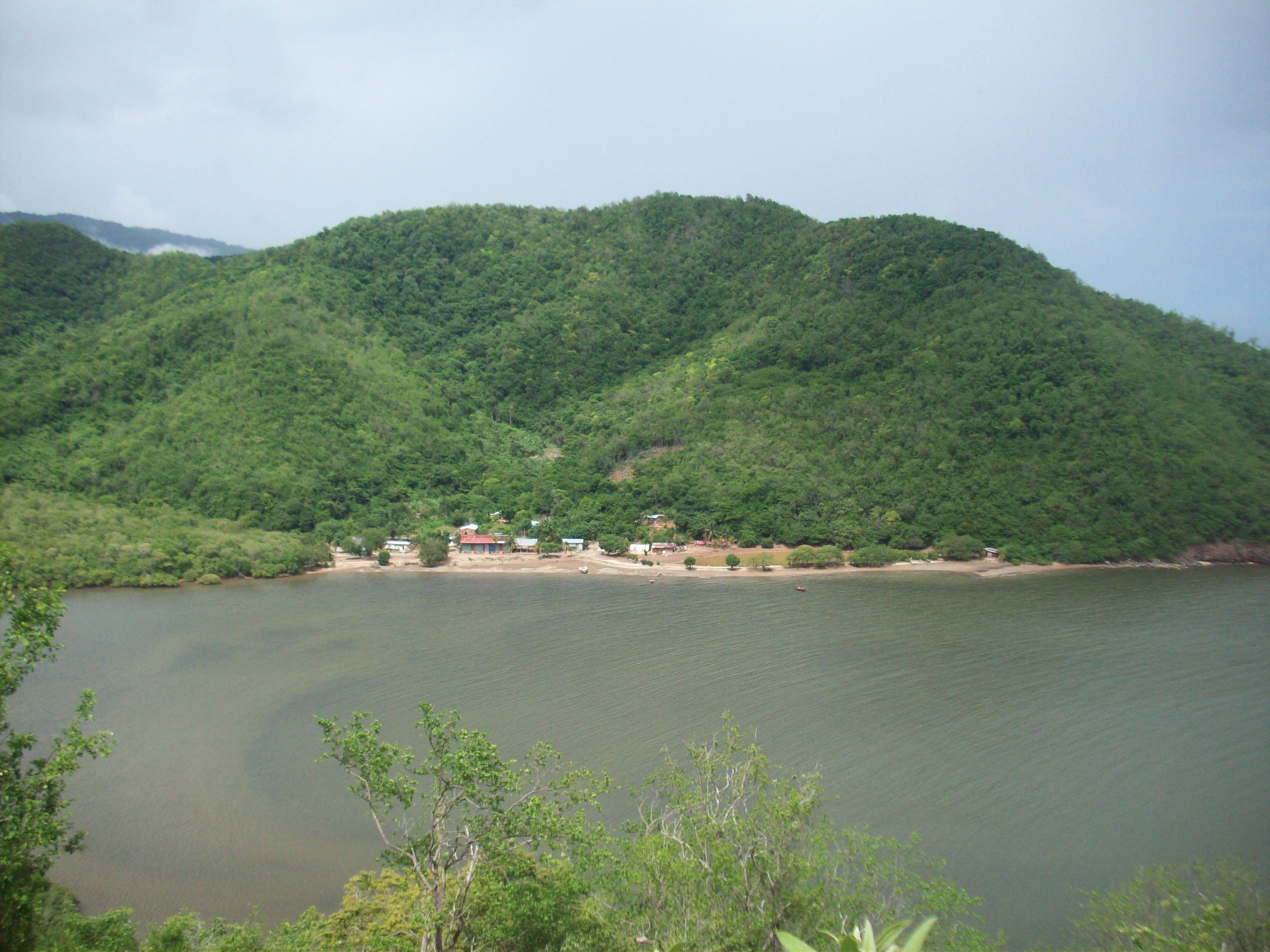
- Panoramic photo of Ensenada Mapire
- Interactive map of Mapire
- Coordinates: 10°38′26″N 62°8′58″W
- Country: Venezuela
- State: Sucre
- Municipality: Valdez
- Parish: Bideau

Government
  - Mayor: Jesus Ramirez Lopez

Population
  - Total: 120
- Demonym: Maripero
- Time zone: UTC−04:00 (VET)
- Postal code: 6150
- Website: Official website

Mapire is a town situated in the Bideau Parish of the Valdez Municipality, Sucre, Venezuela. The town is situated 24 kilometres (15 mi) from Guiria, the capital of Valdez, on the Paria Peninsula.

== Overview ==
Mapire is located on the south coast of the Paria Peninsula, 4 kilometres (2.5 mi) west of Puerto de Hierro and an hour's trip from Guiria by boat. The bay is open towards the south and the beach is 100 metres (330 ft) long. The town is divided into two sectors: La Playa (the beach), which is mostly inhabited by fishermen and their families, and El Cerro (the hill), where dry cocoa is produced. The town's school, chapel, and river run through El Cerro.

José Stronghold Logan claims the first inhabitants settled the town to cultivate cocoa. The town's patron saint is the Coronation of Virgen del Valle (May 31).

== Gallery ==
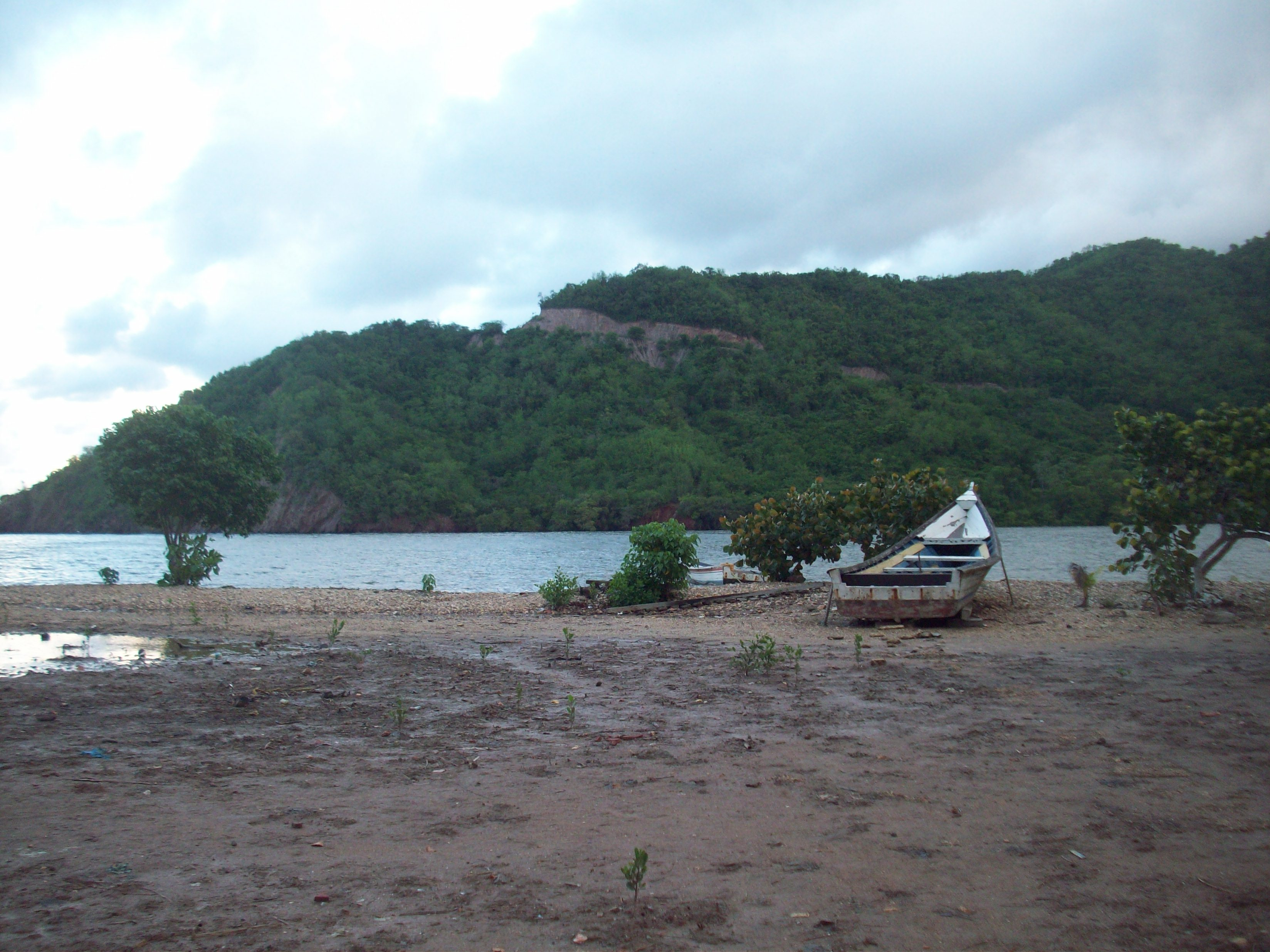
Beach

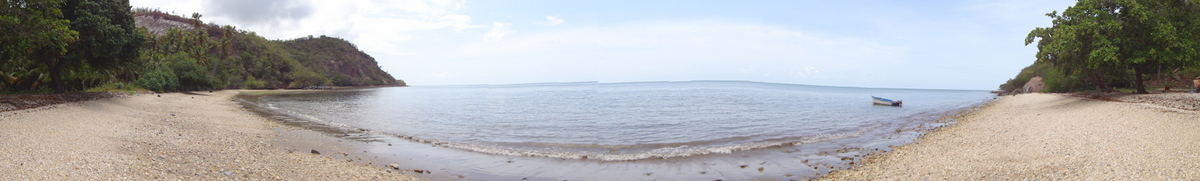
Beach

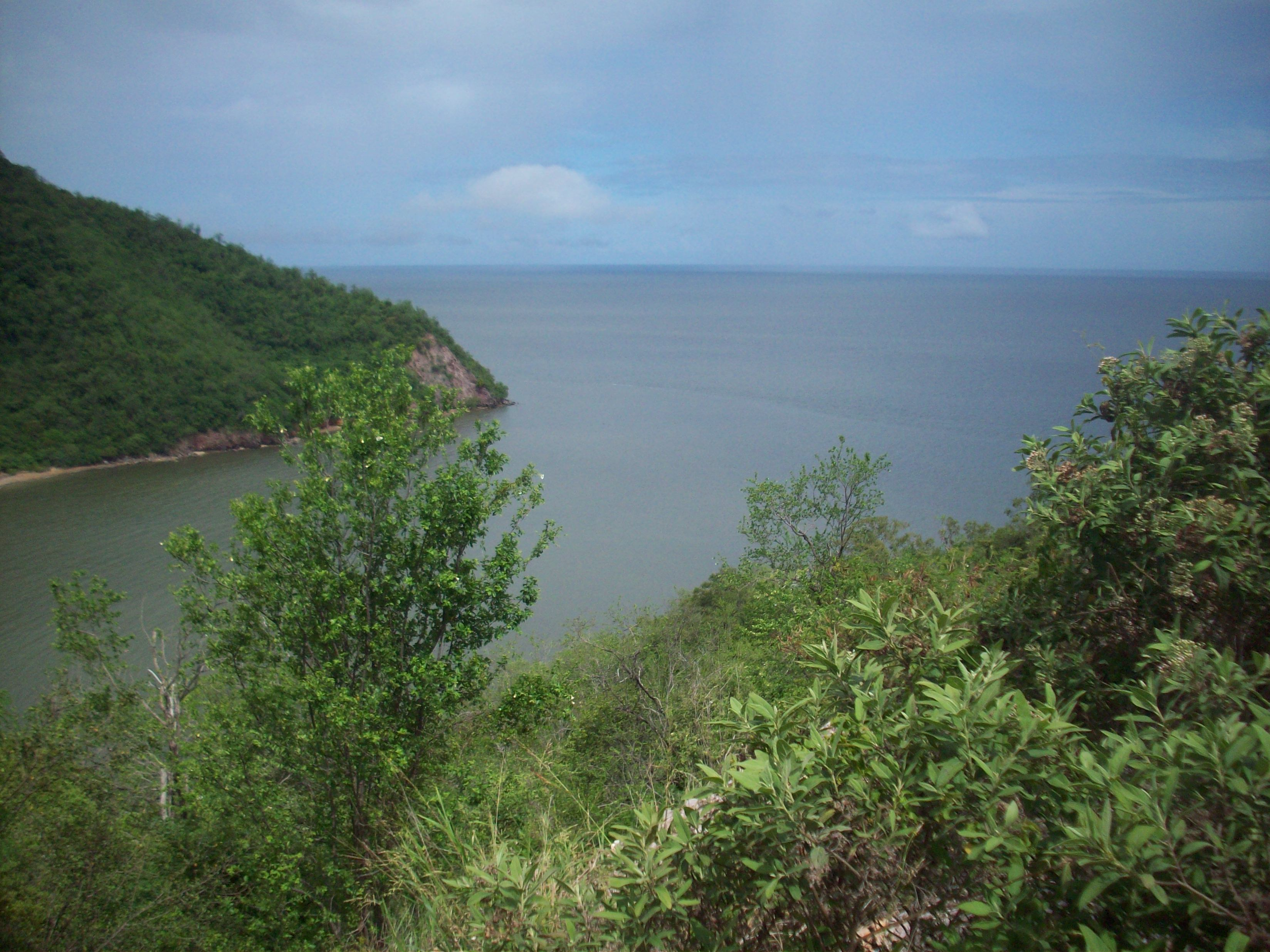
Entrance to the cove

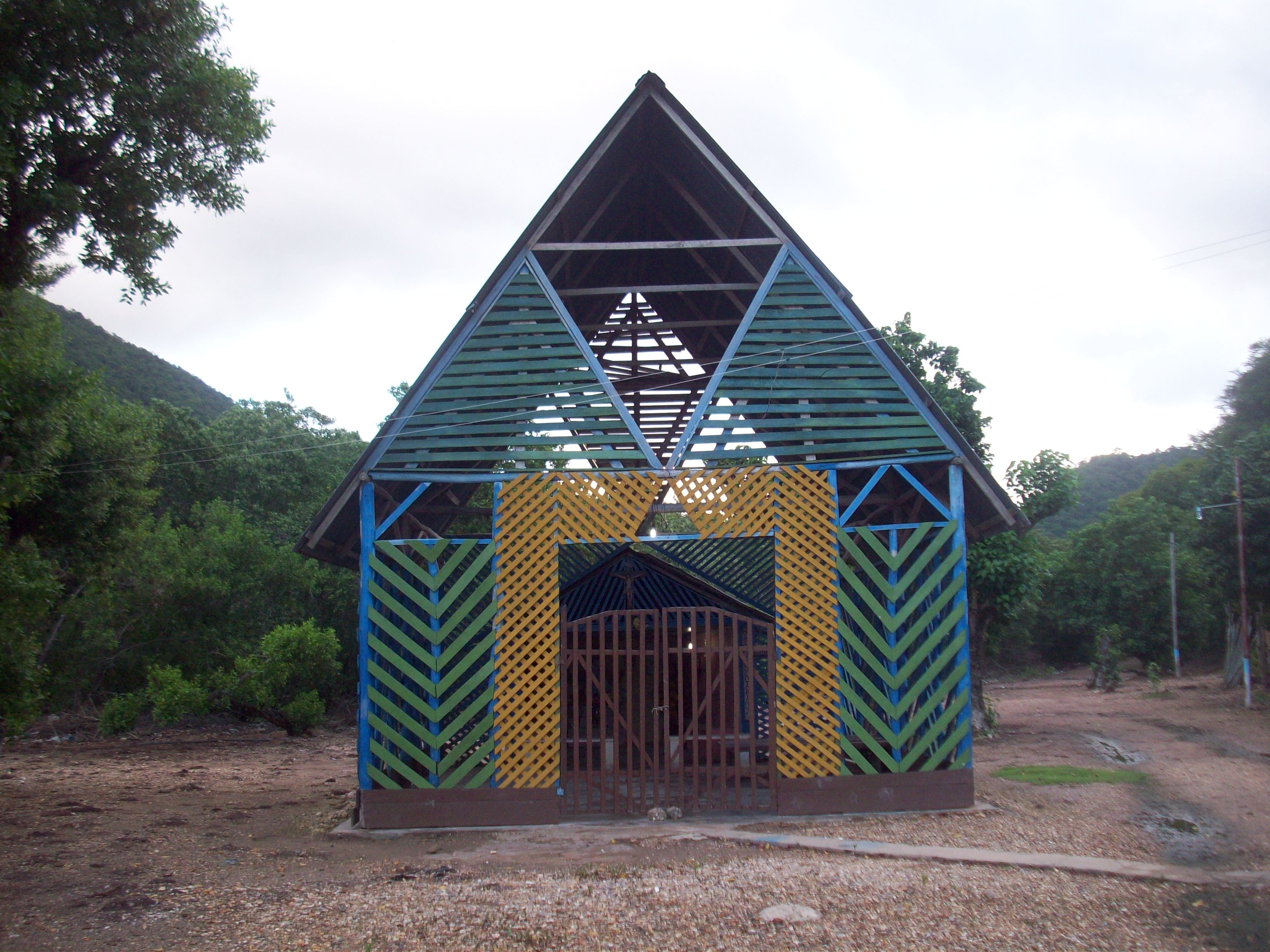
Mapire Chapel

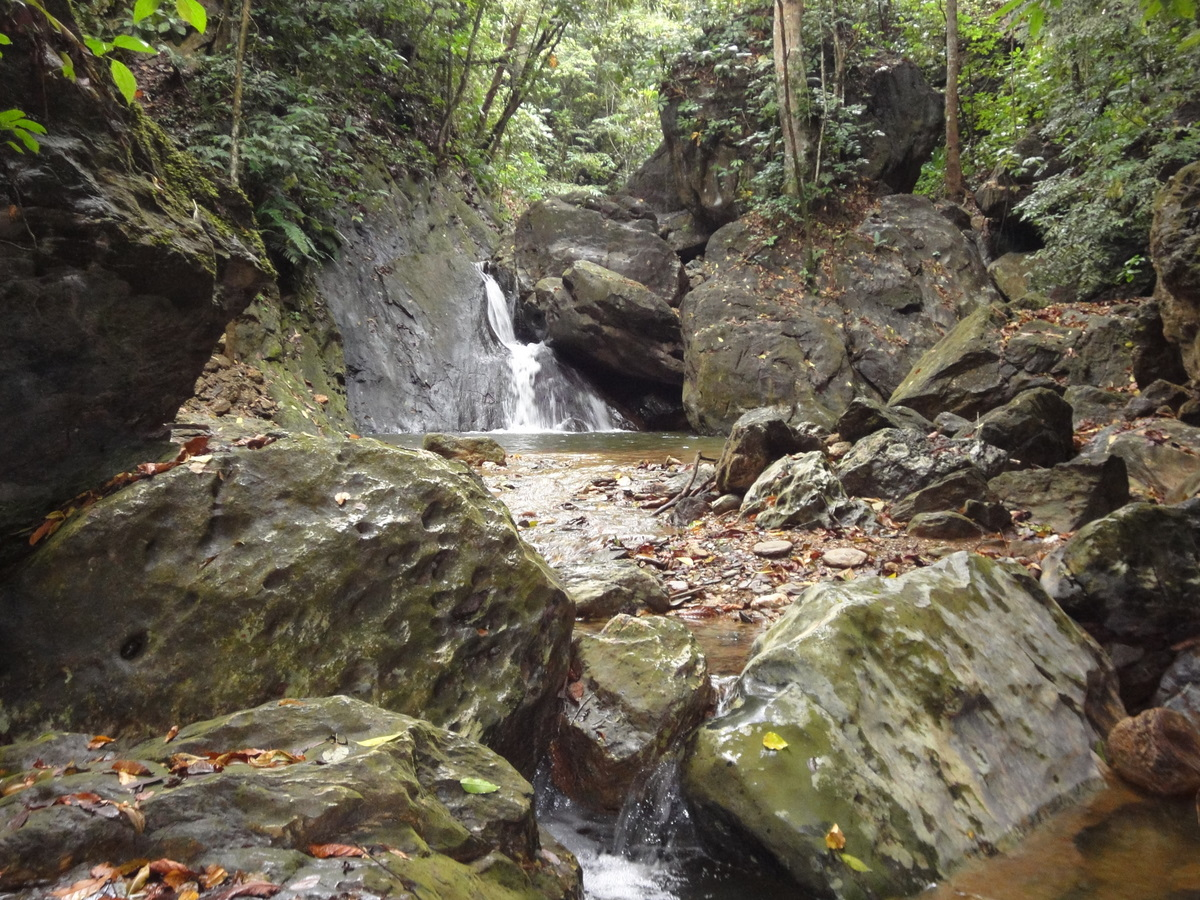
Blue Pool La Ceiba
