= Rio Grande de la Costa =

Coordinates: 11°04′08″N 62°13′07″W

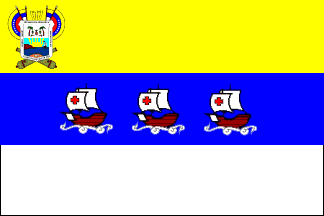
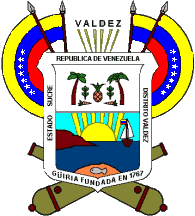
- Flag Seal
- Nickname: "The Jewel of Paria"
- Rio Grande de la Costa houses
- Country: Venezuela
- State: Sucre
- Municipality: Rio Grande de la Costa
- Founded: December 8th ,1767

Government
  - Mayor: Jesús Ramírez (PSUV)

Area
  - Total: 1,365 km^{2} (527 sq mi)

Population (2011)
  - Total: 40
- Demonym: Riograndeños (a)
- Time zone: UTC-4:30 (VST)
- Postal code: 6161
- Area code: 0294
- Website: riogrande.6te.net (in Spanish)
- Area and population figures are for the Community

Rio Grande de la Costa is a hamlet in Valdez Municipality, Sucre, Venezuela.

The hamlet can be reached by boat from the Gulf of Paria through the inlet of the Rio Grande, 34,6 kilometres from Güiria.

The hamlet has about 40 inhabitants. It has nearly four centuries of history. Its colonial past can be seen in the splendid colonial houses in Plaza Bolivar, and some old buildings.

== Origin ==
- -The town's name comes from the great river that has its source in the mountains: The Rio Grande

== Quick facts ==
- -Currency: Bolívar fuerte (VEF)
- -Economy : Fishing, Agriculture and Tourism.
- -Electricity:110/60.
- -Coordinates:10° 39' 22.44" N 62° 7' 30.39" W
- -country code: 58
- -Official language:Español .
- -Religion:Most of the population is Christian religious.
- -Patron Saint:Virgen del Carmen - August

== People ==
Most of the people in Rio Grande are of Trinidadian descent.

== Geography ==
Rio Grande de la Costa is located in the Cristobal Colon Parish - Paria Peninsula in Sucre state, Valdez Municipality, Most of the surface consists of a mountainous terrain with some small valleys and rivers flowing into the sea. is largely covered by rainforest .

=== Limits ===
- To the North: limits with the Sucre parish belonging to Arismendi Municipality, by the mountain range of the Paria Peninsula.
- To the South: with the Golfo de Paria.
- To the East: borders the dragons mouth and the Gulf of Paria, certainly bordering Trinidad waters for a few kilometers to the end of the peninsula with the international territory.
- To the West: with the Bideau Parish belonging to Valdez Municipality.

== Rio Grande Cove ==
This Cove is home to several fishermen families. There is a small river that supplies the population. This bay is open to the south. The beach is 100 meters long.

== Climate ==
Rio Grande de la Costa, is in the tropics, enjoys a tropical climate influenced by the Maritime northeast winds., average temperature is 26 °C, and the average maximum temperature is 34 °C during the day and 20 °C on average at night. Humidity is high, particularly during the wet season, when the 85% average. receives an average of 211 cm ³ of rain per year, usually concentrated in the months from June to December, when in brief, intense floods occur frequently. The precipitation increases in the North Range, where you can receive up to 381 cm ³. During the dry season, the drought attacks the top center of the territory. It is outside the hurricane zone.

== Gallery ==
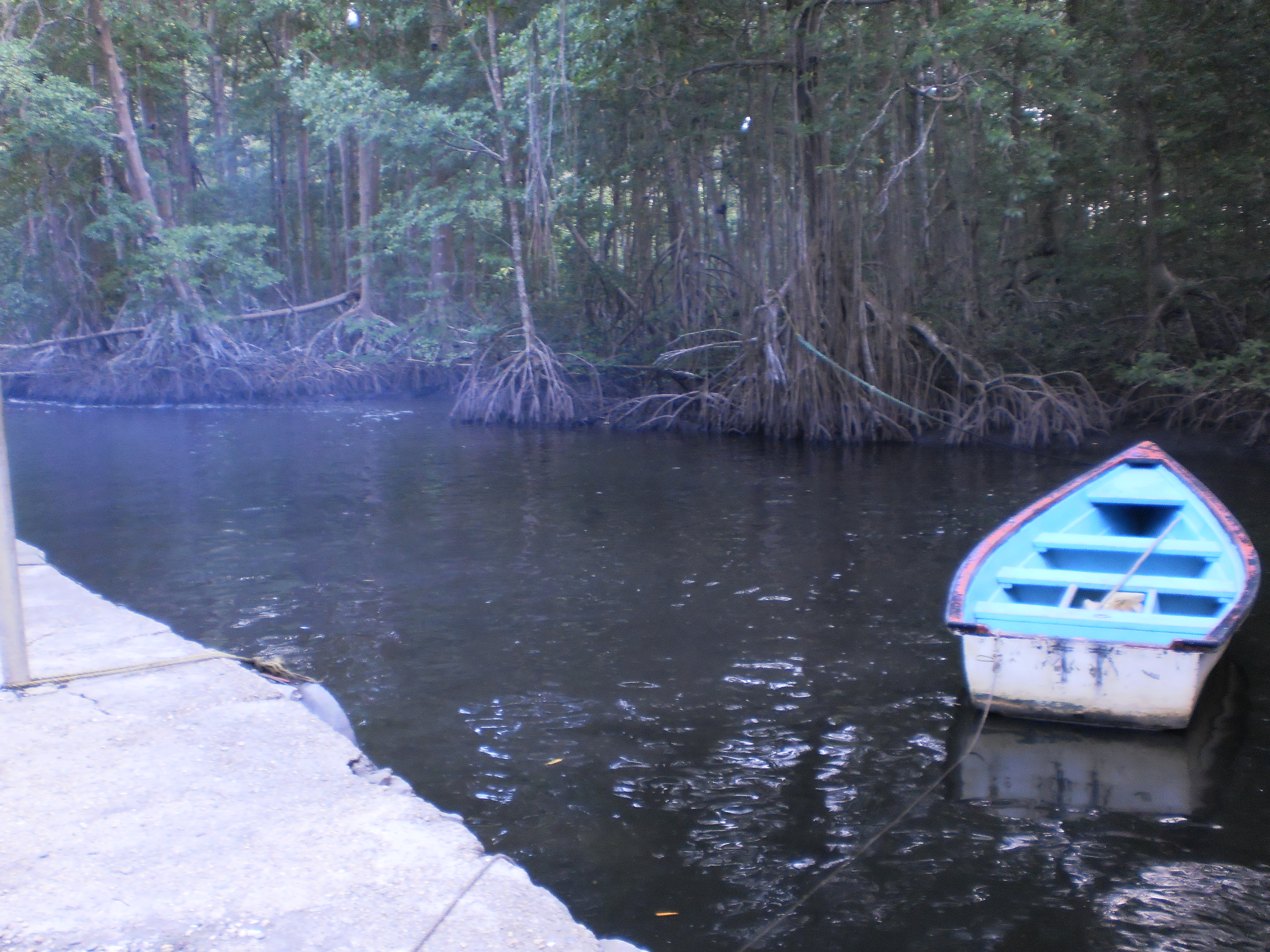
Dock in the channel of Rio Grande de la Costa

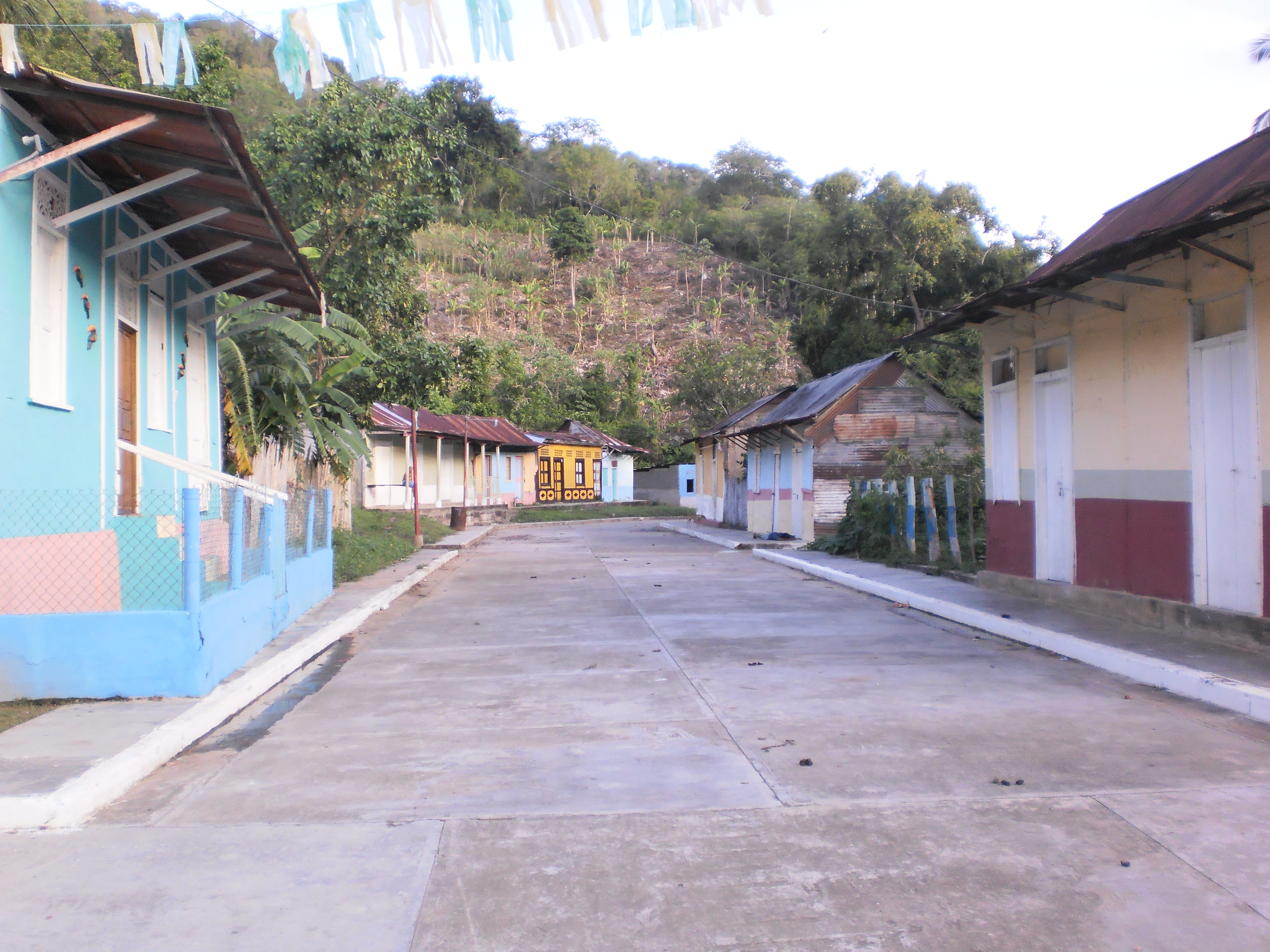
Main street of Rio Grande de la Costa

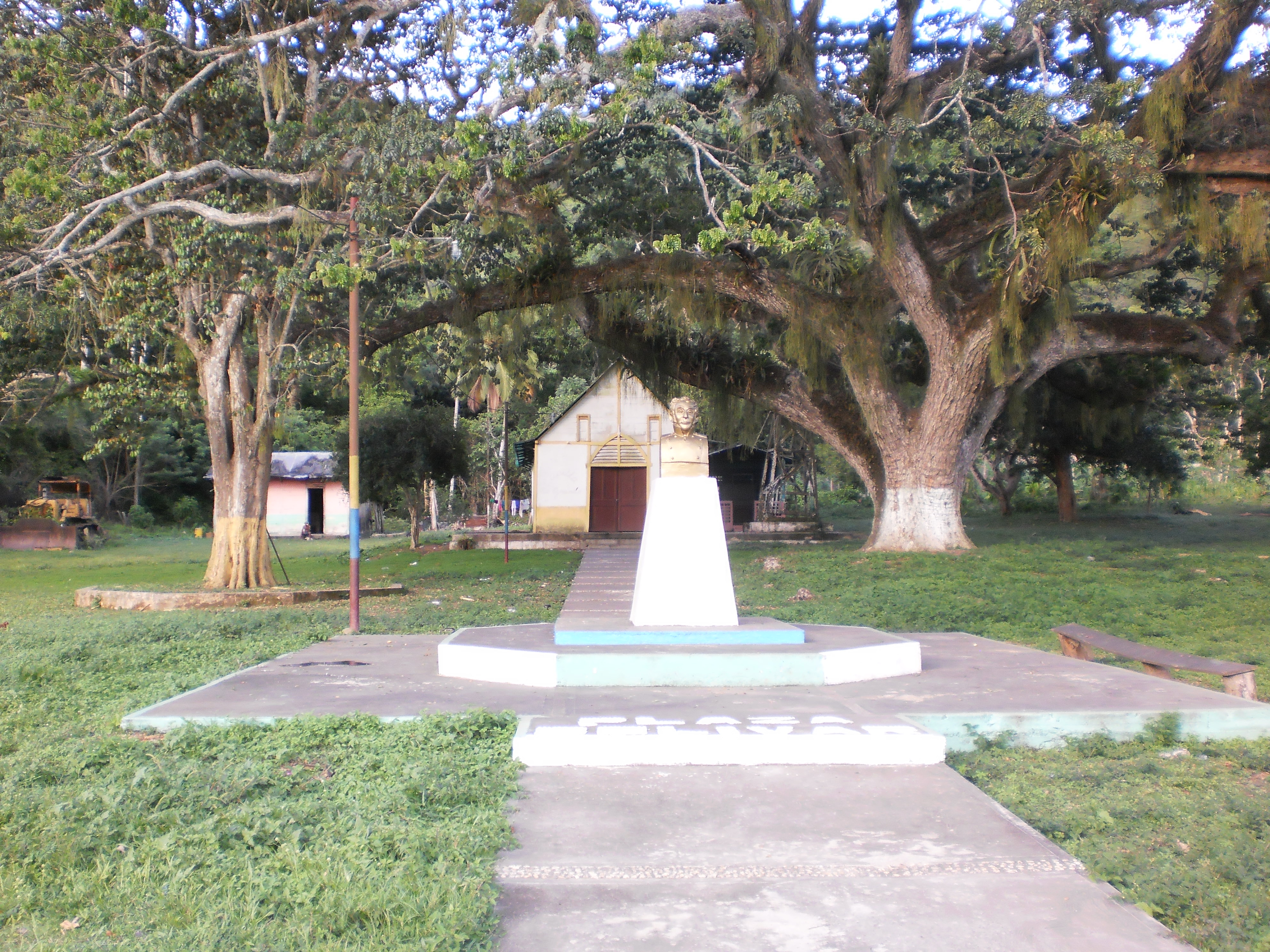
Plaza Bolivar (Rio Grande de la Costa) and chapel

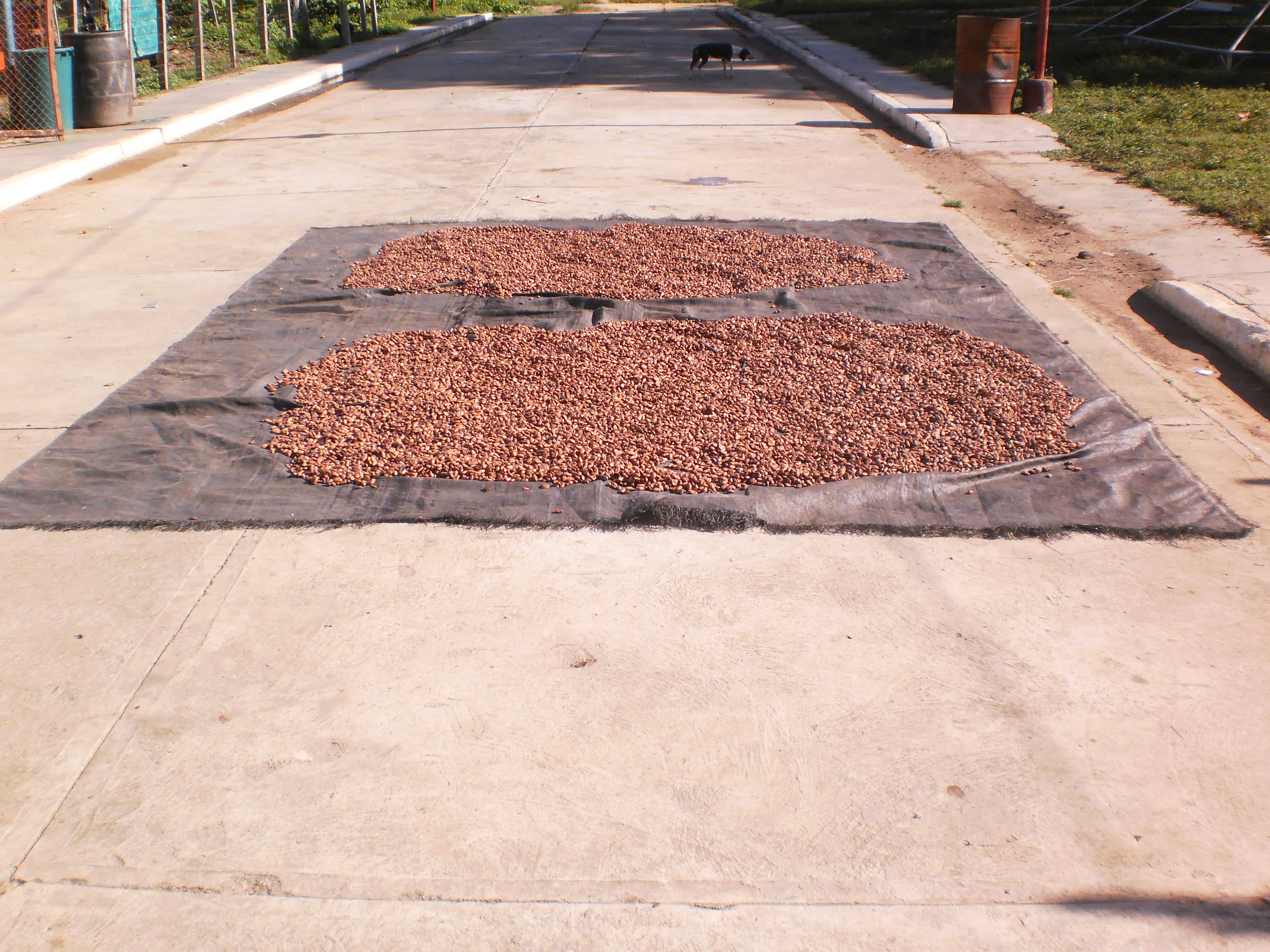
Drying cacao in the main street

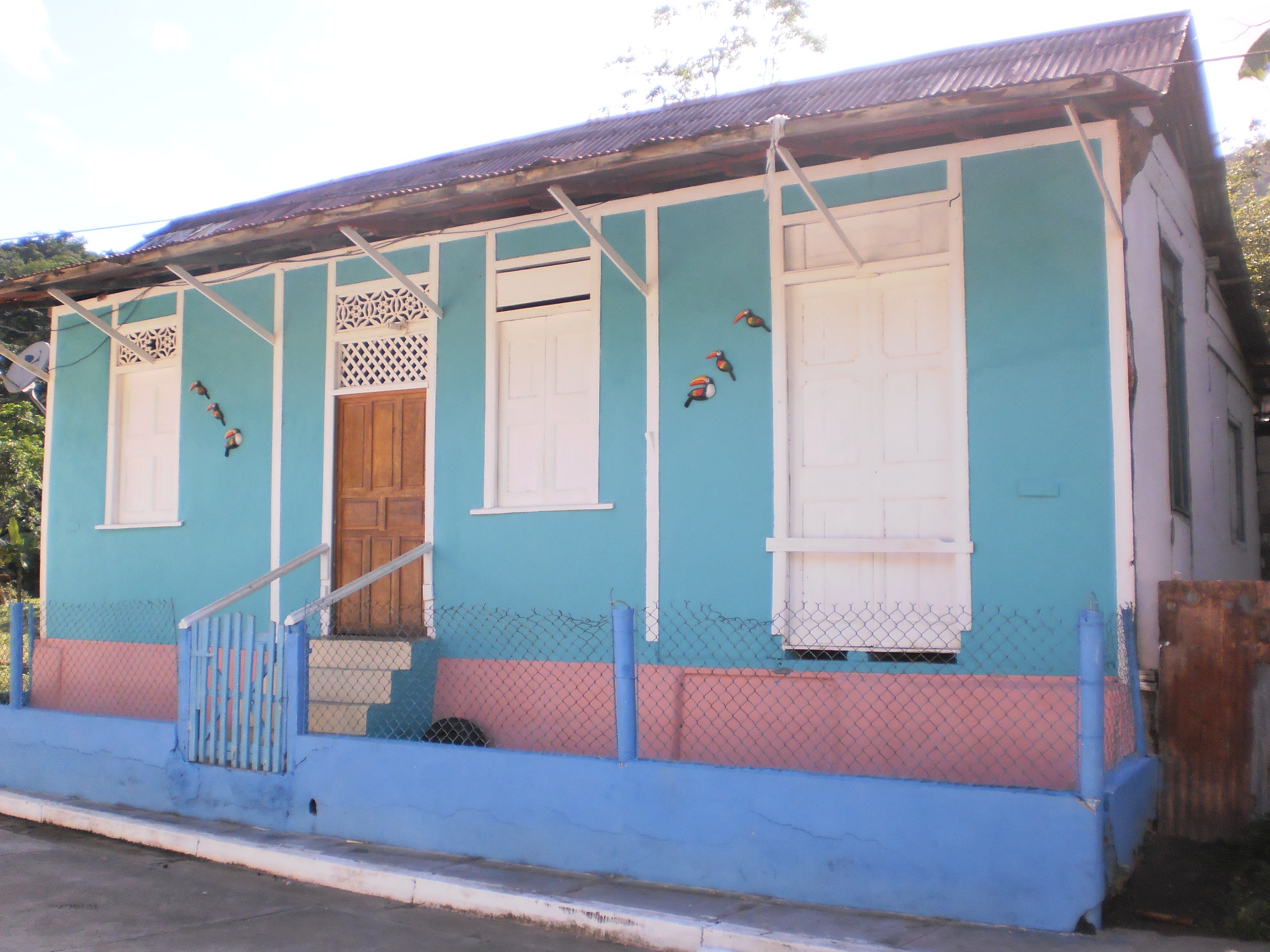
Old house in the main street of Rio Grande de la Costa

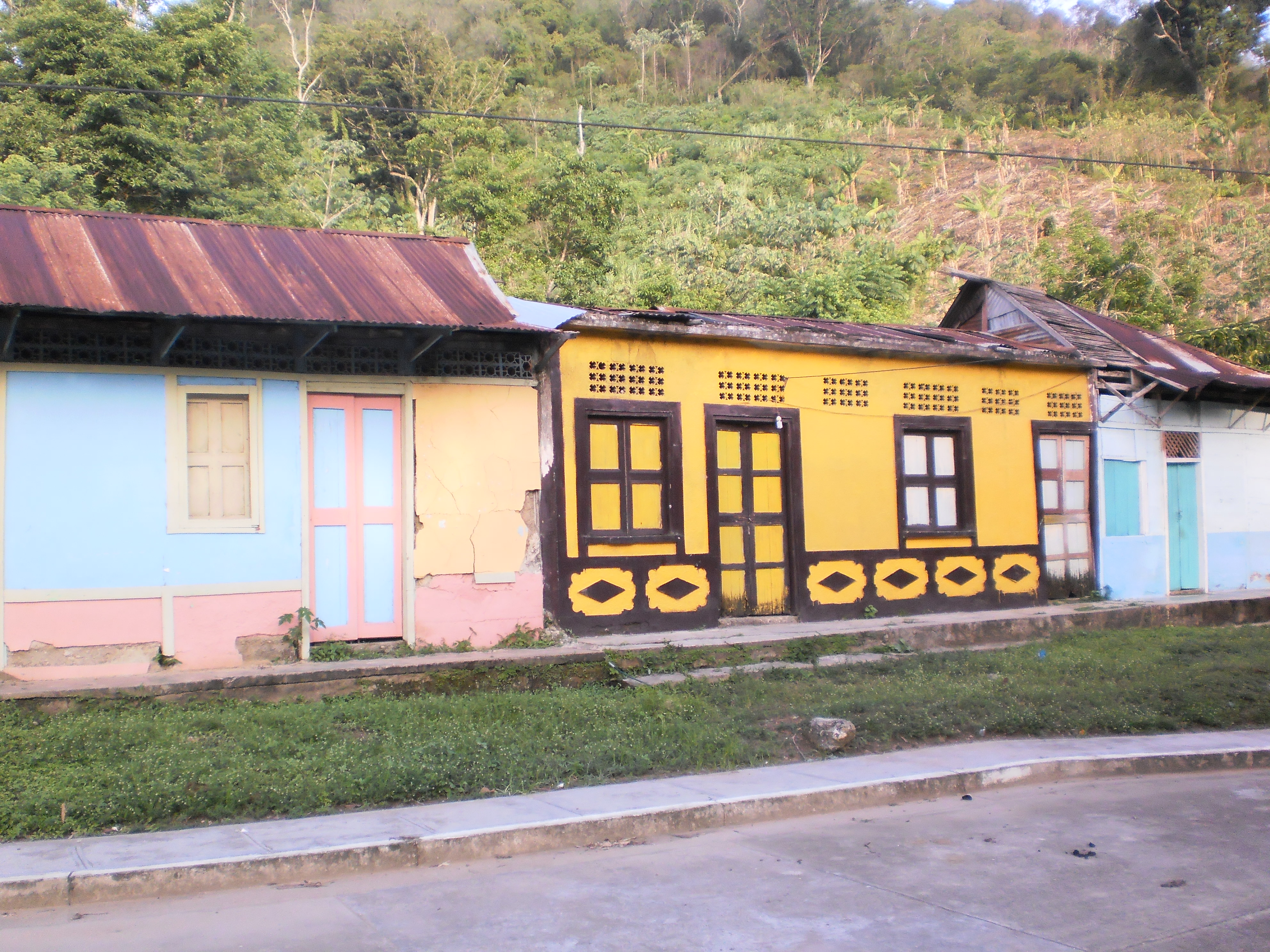
Colonial houses of Rio Grande de la Costa

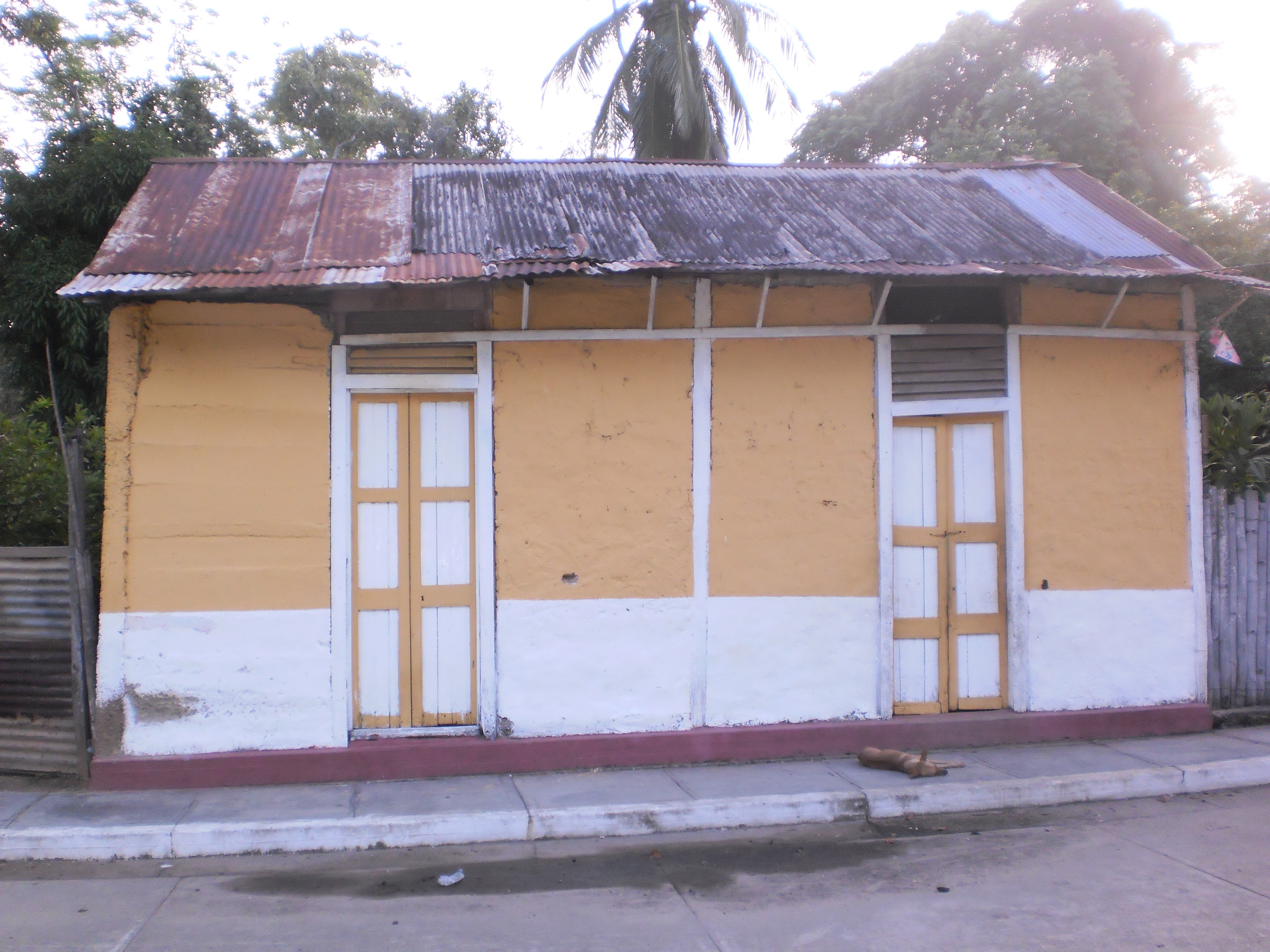
Colonial house

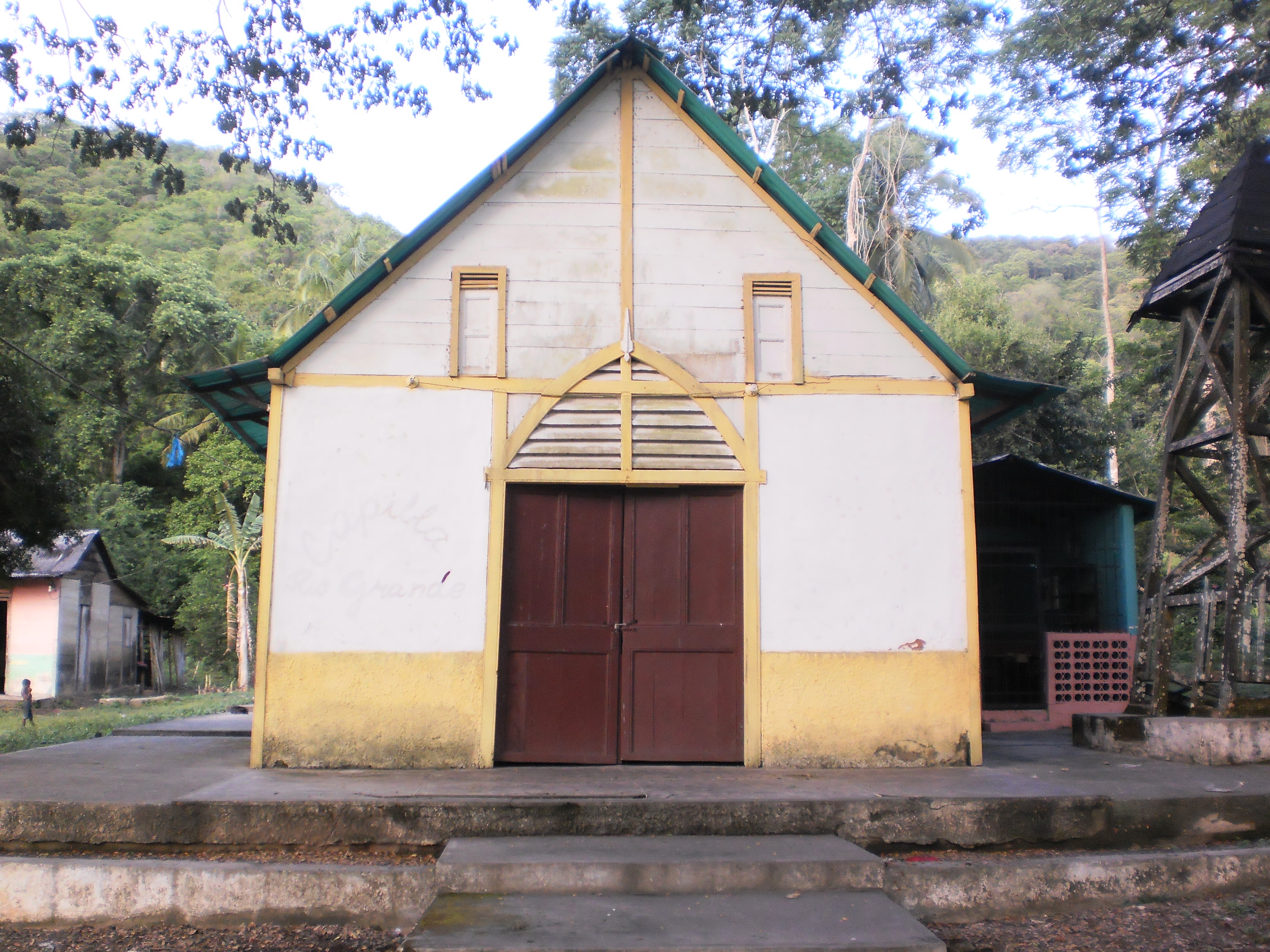
Chapel

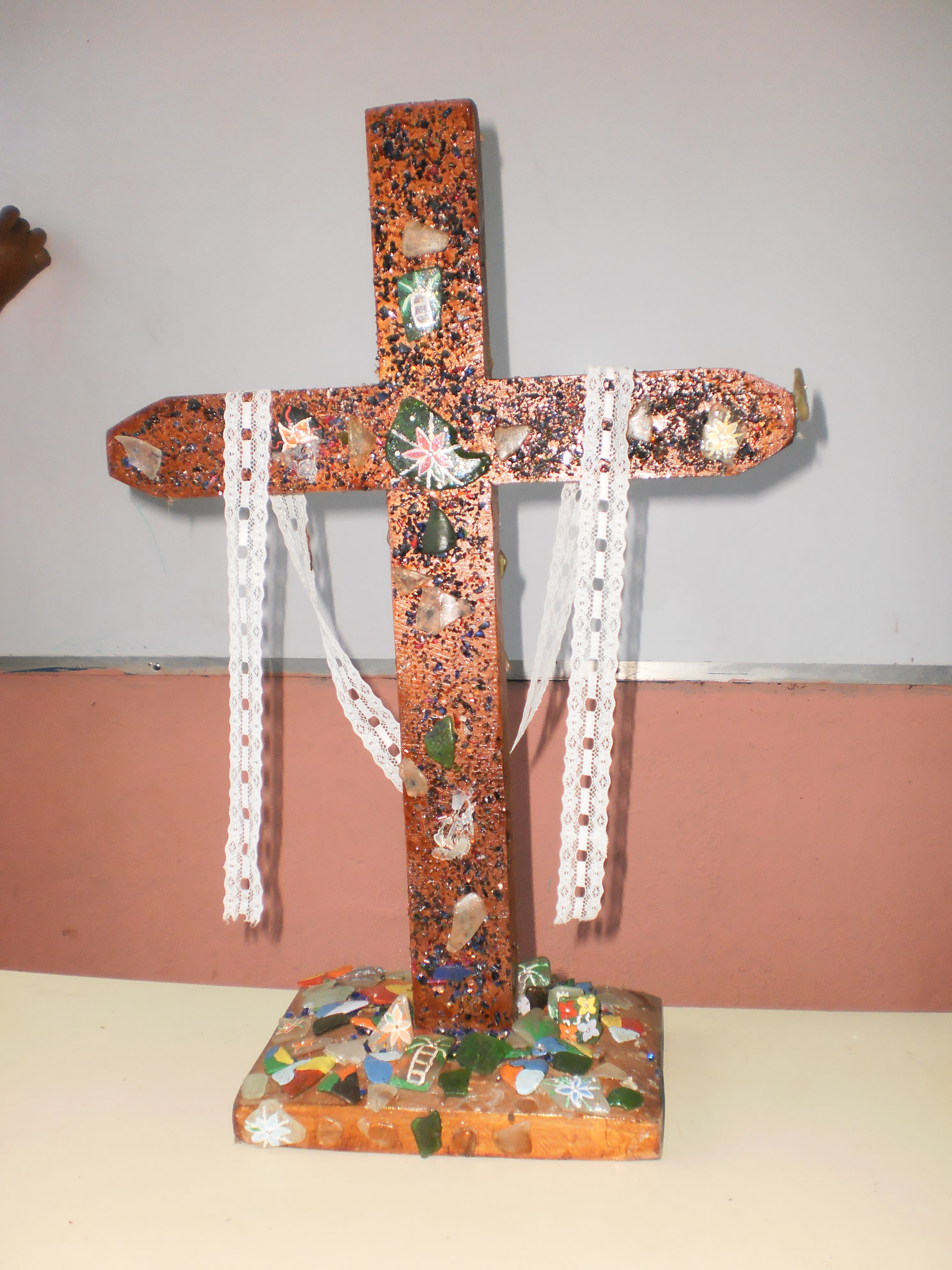
Cruz de Mayo

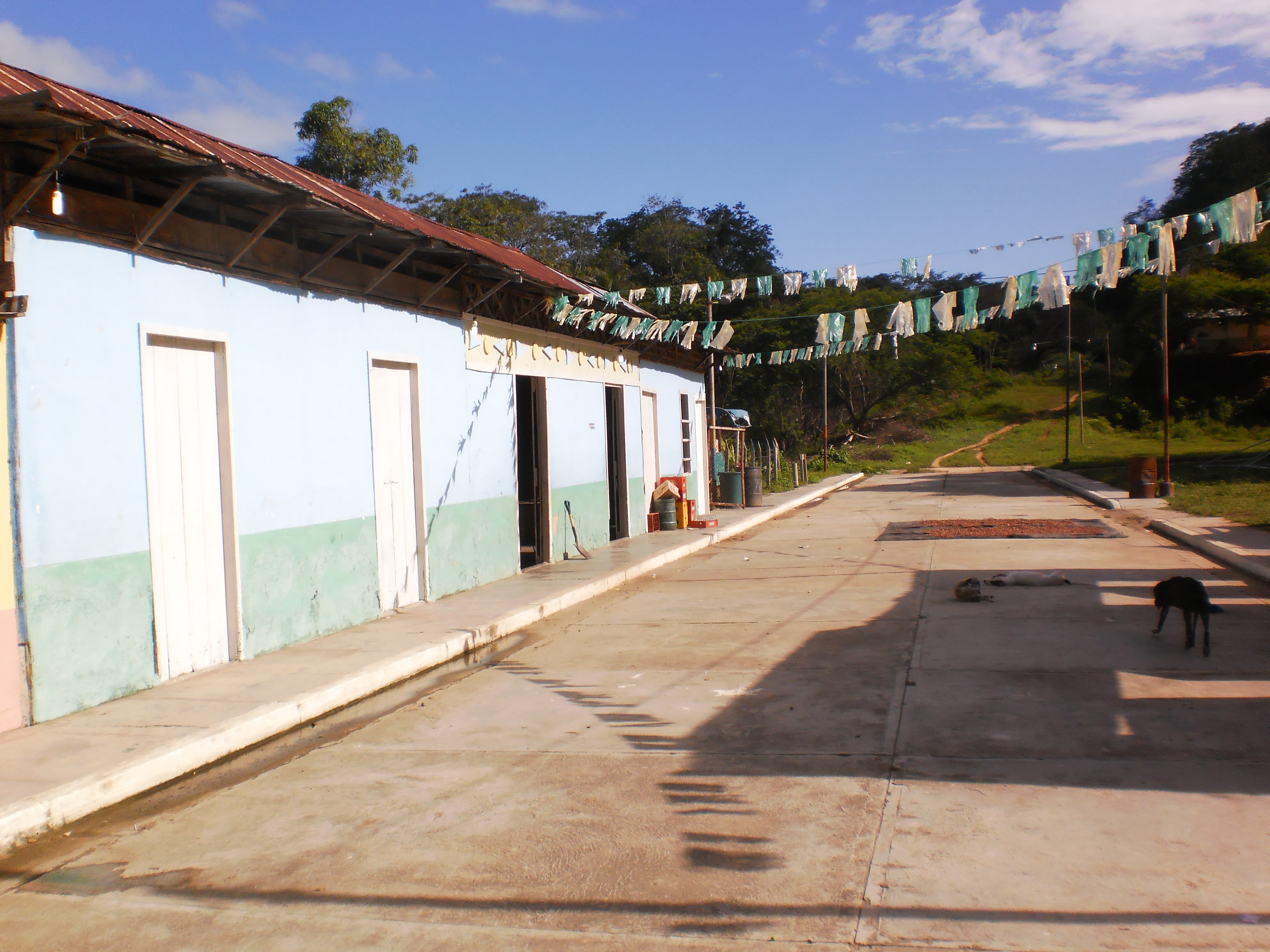
House of the teacher of the town

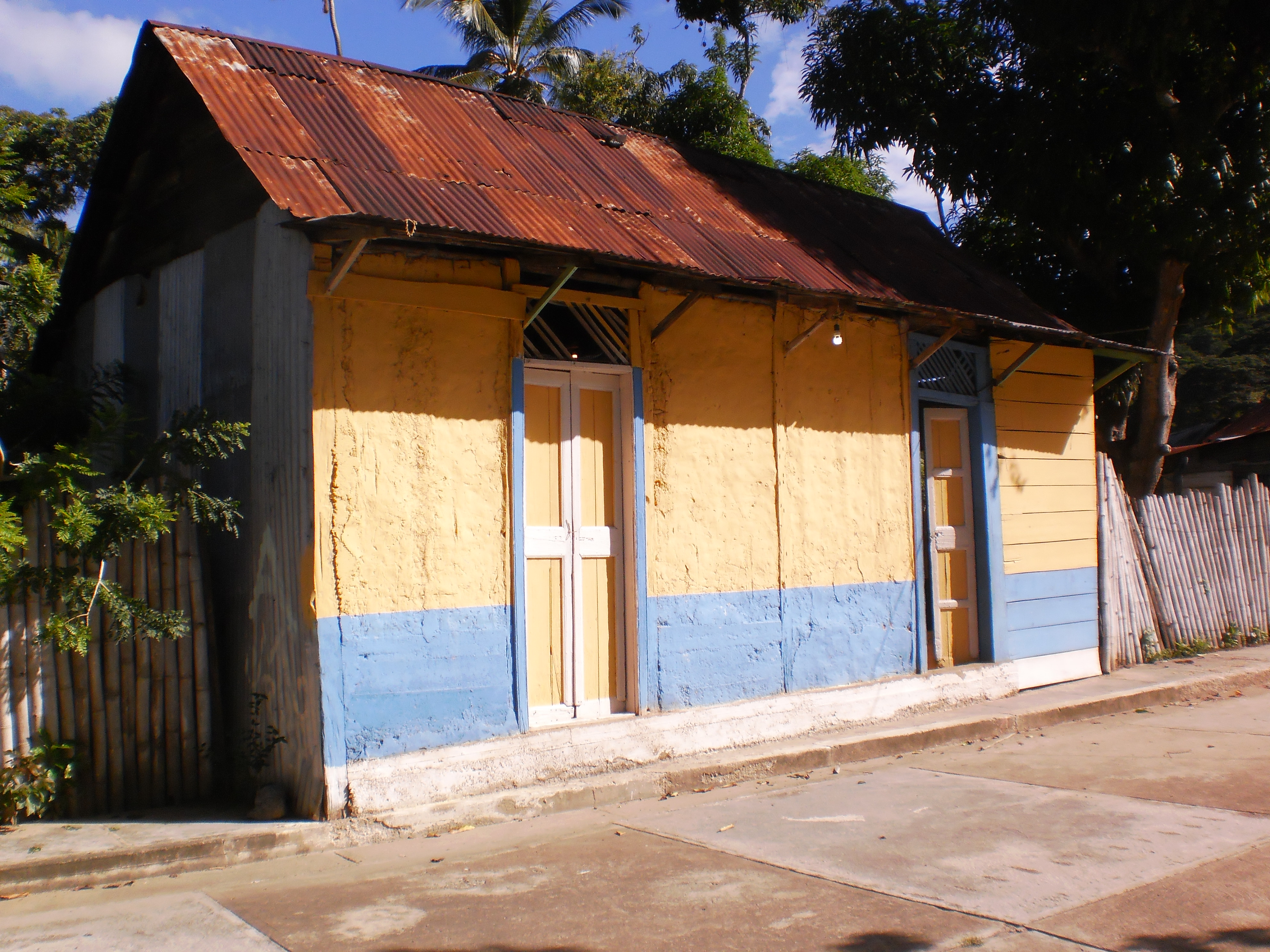
House of the chief of police

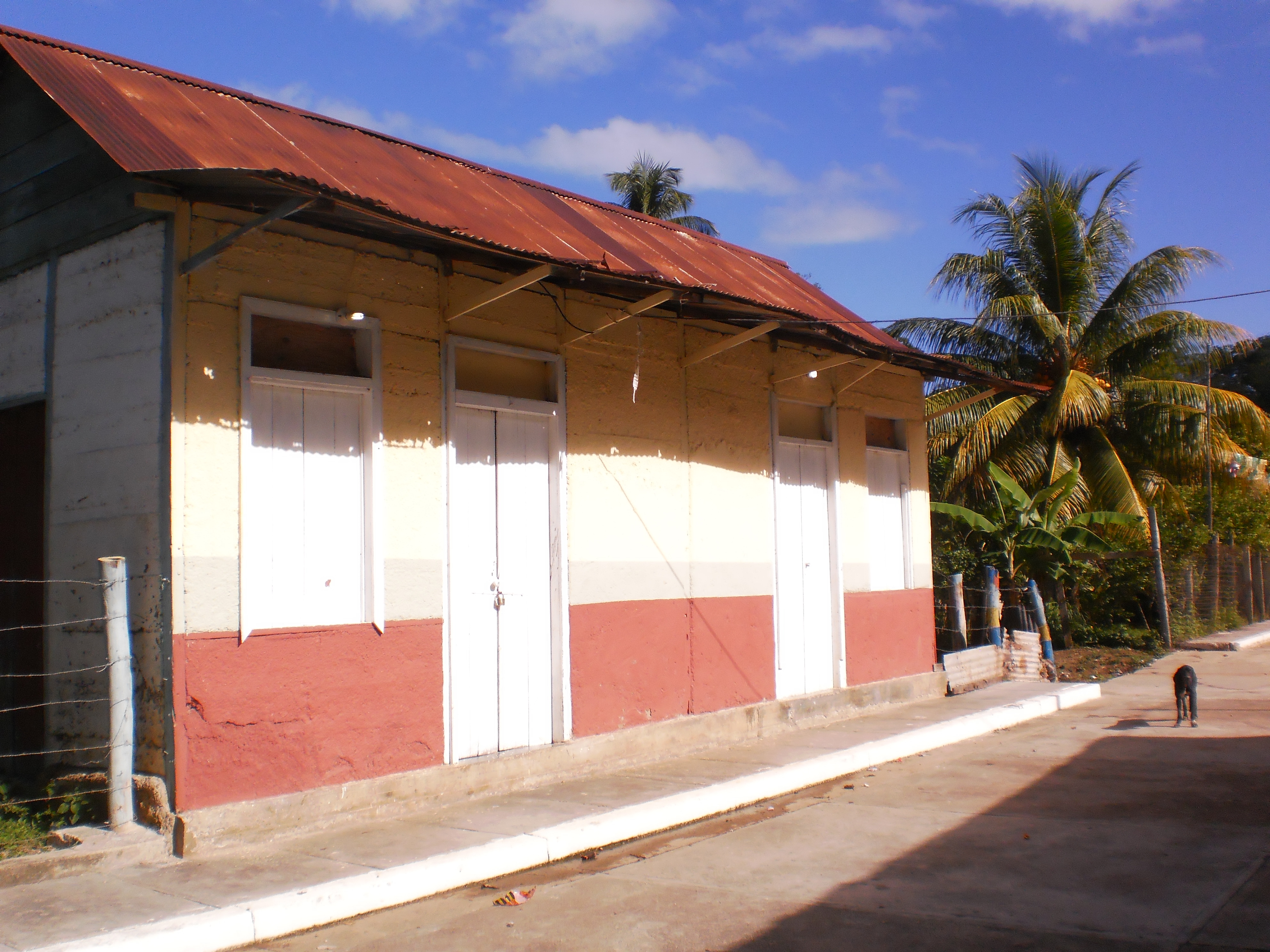
Spectacular house

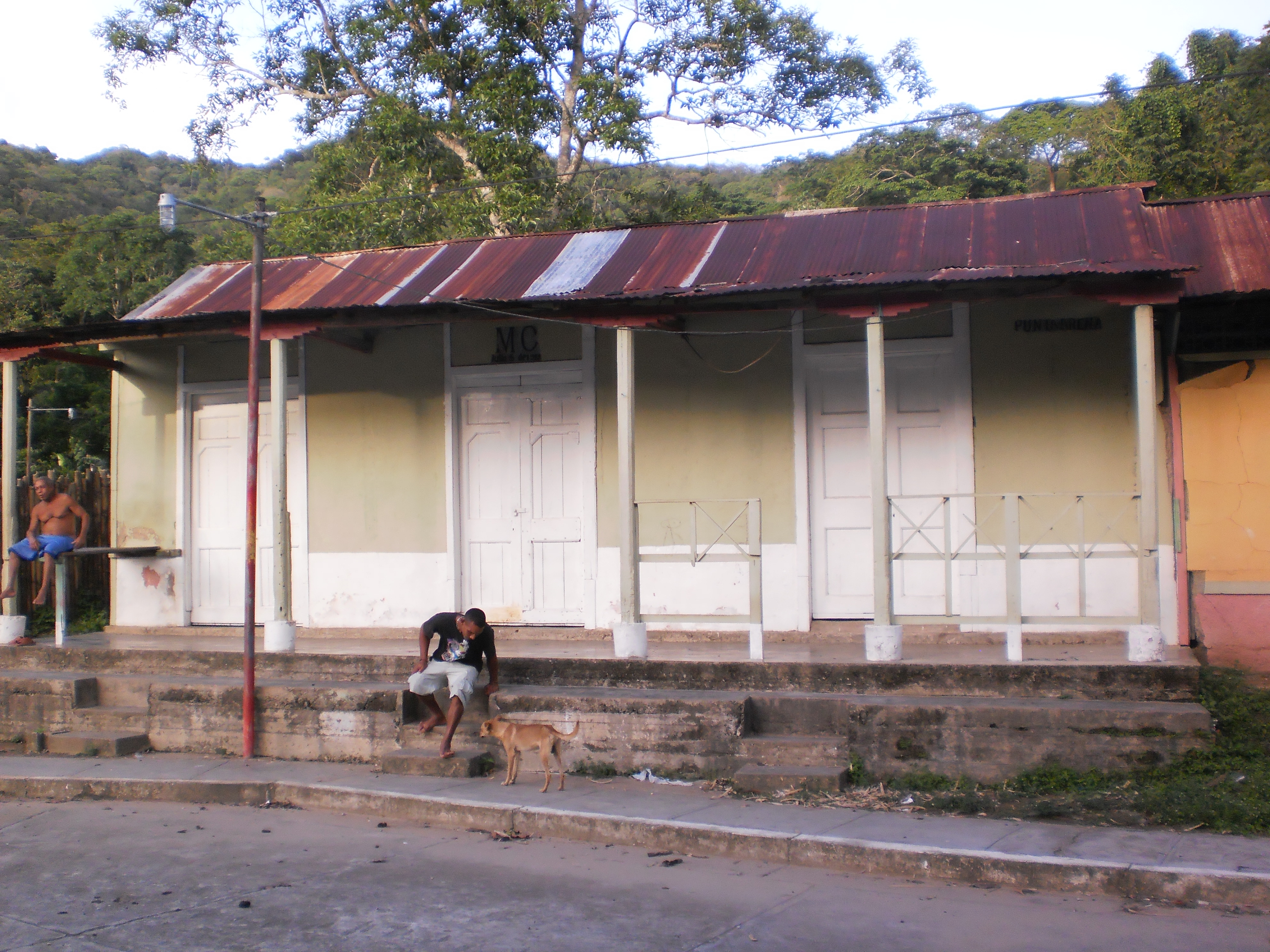
Another spectacular house

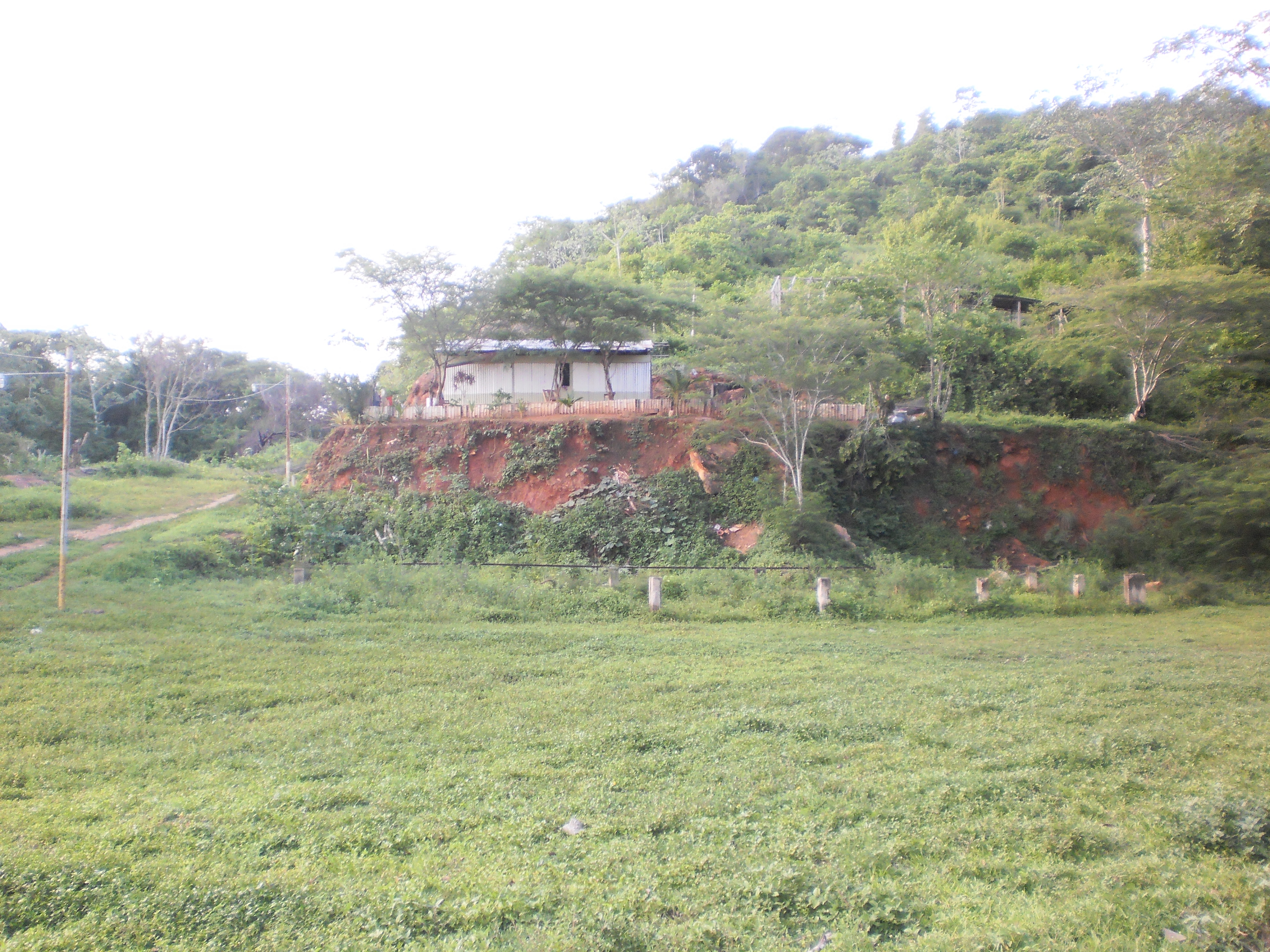
House on the hill

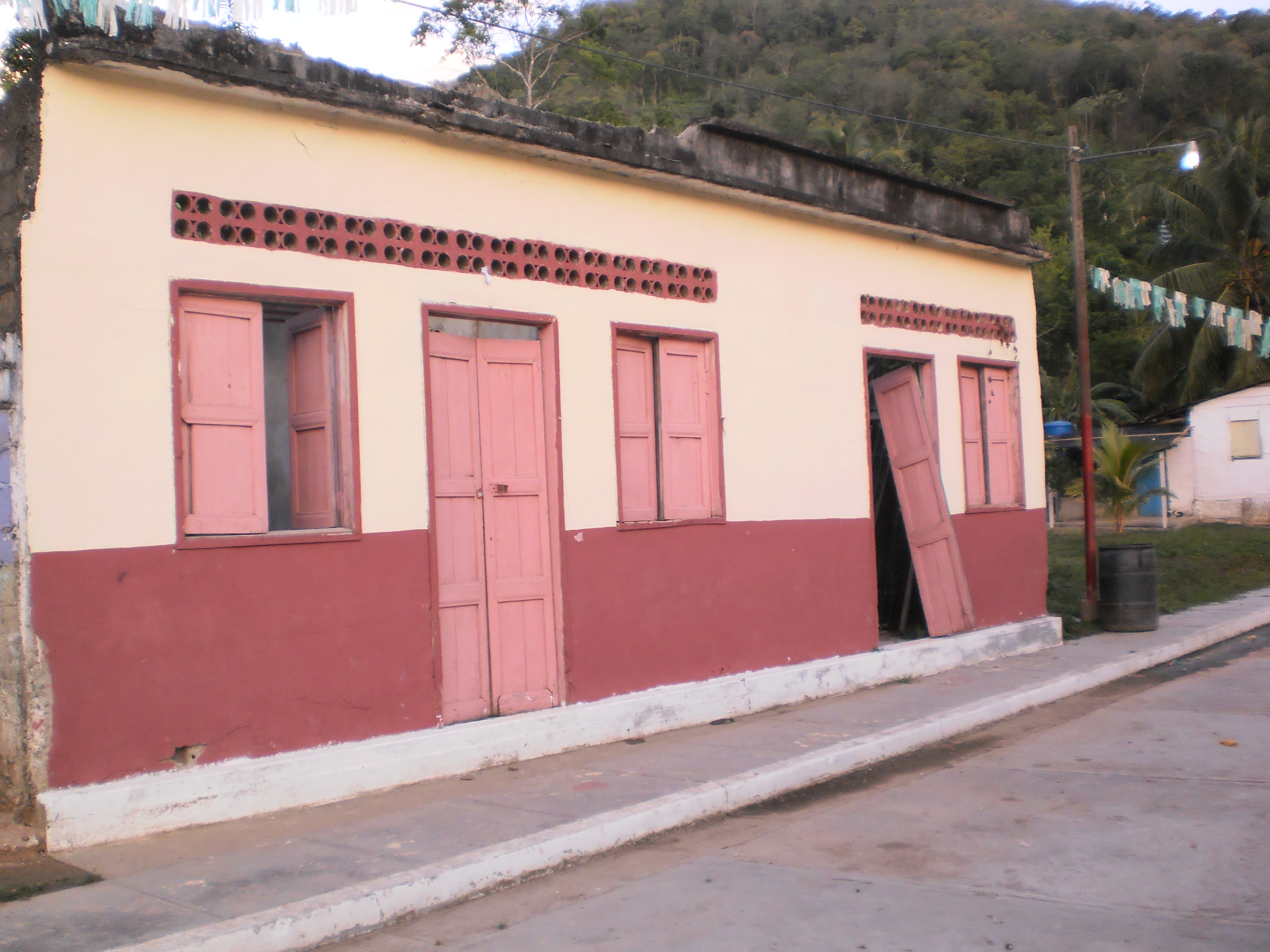
Very pretty house

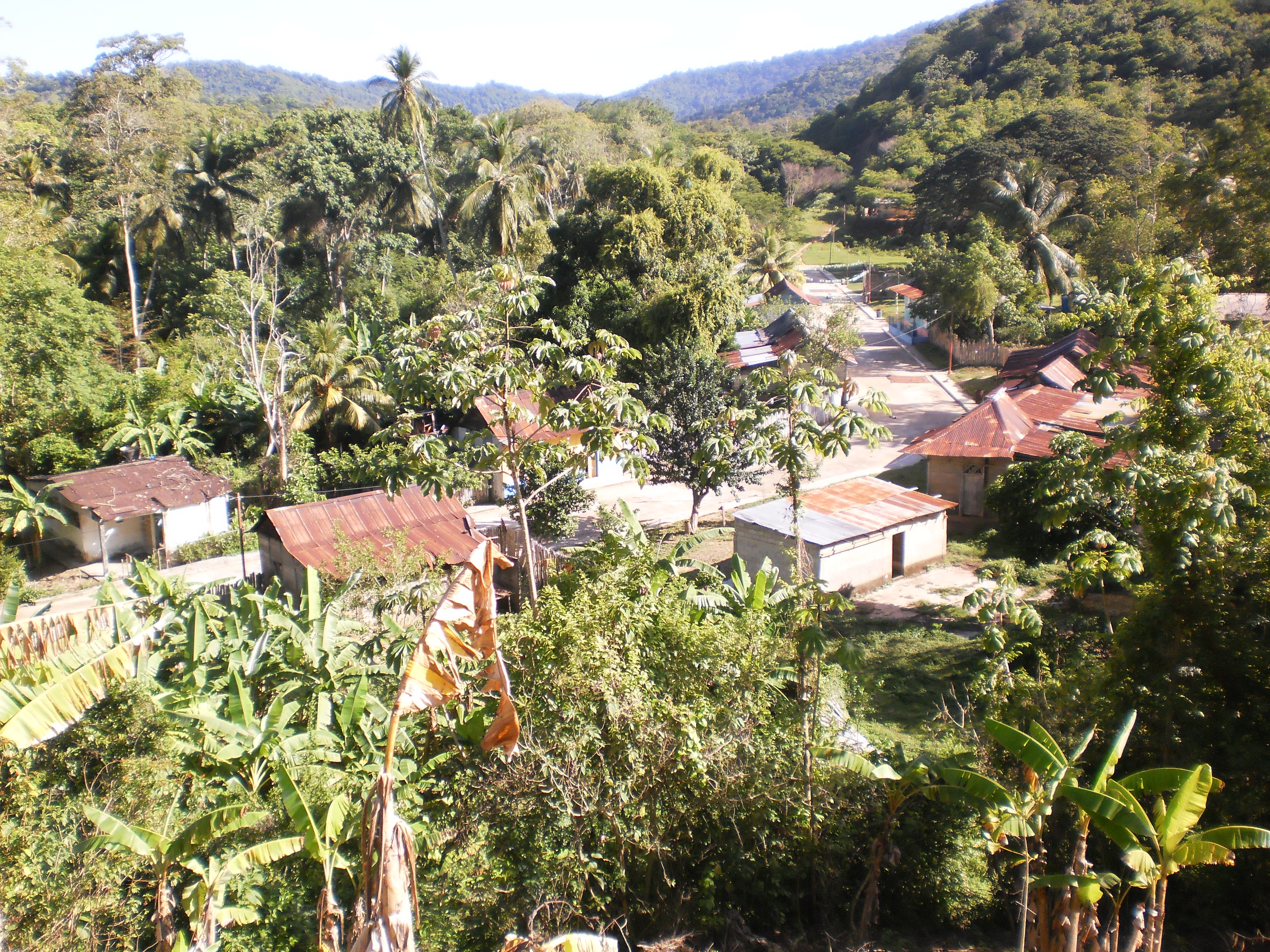
Aerial view of the town

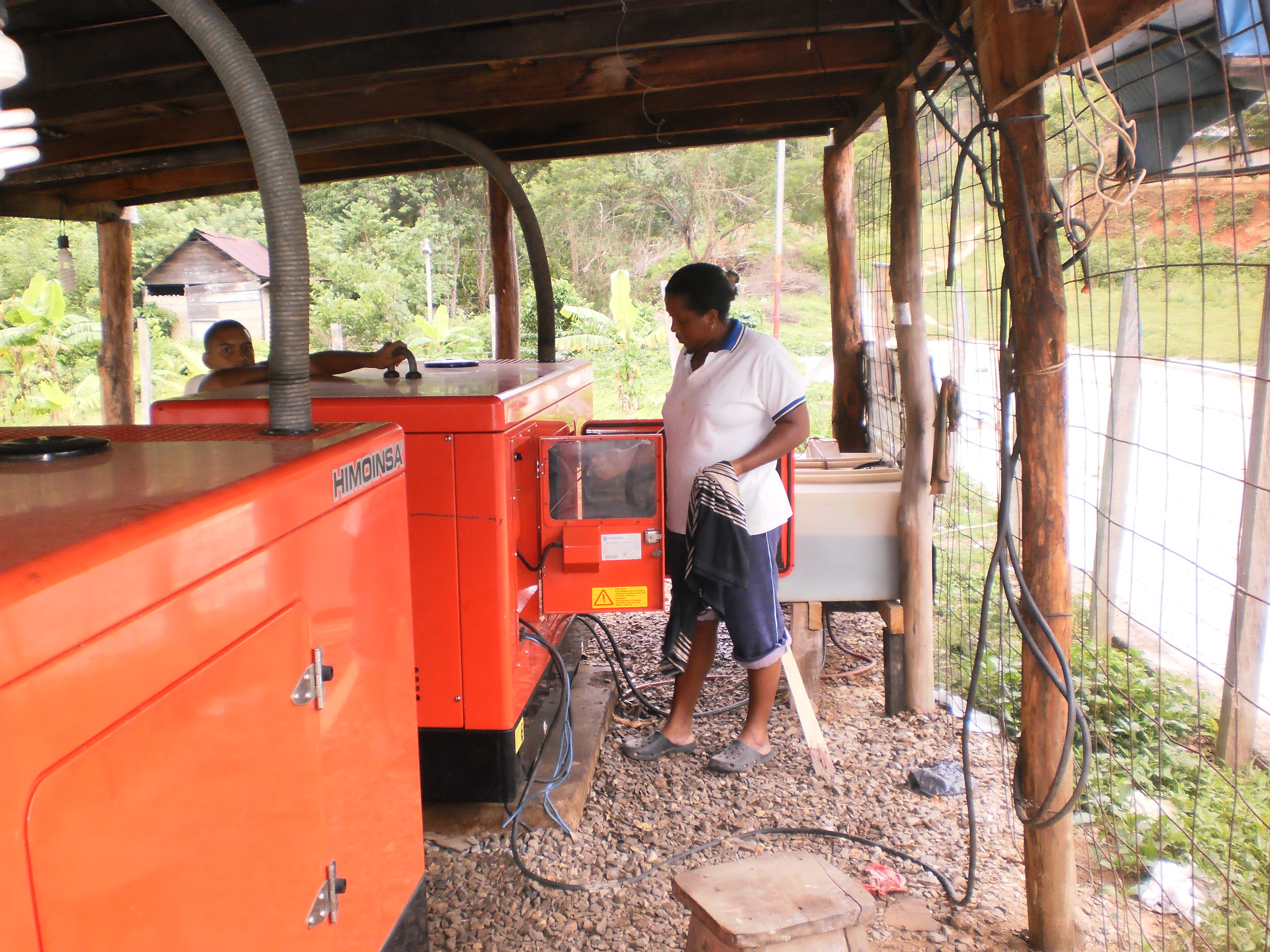
The female professor turning on the electricity

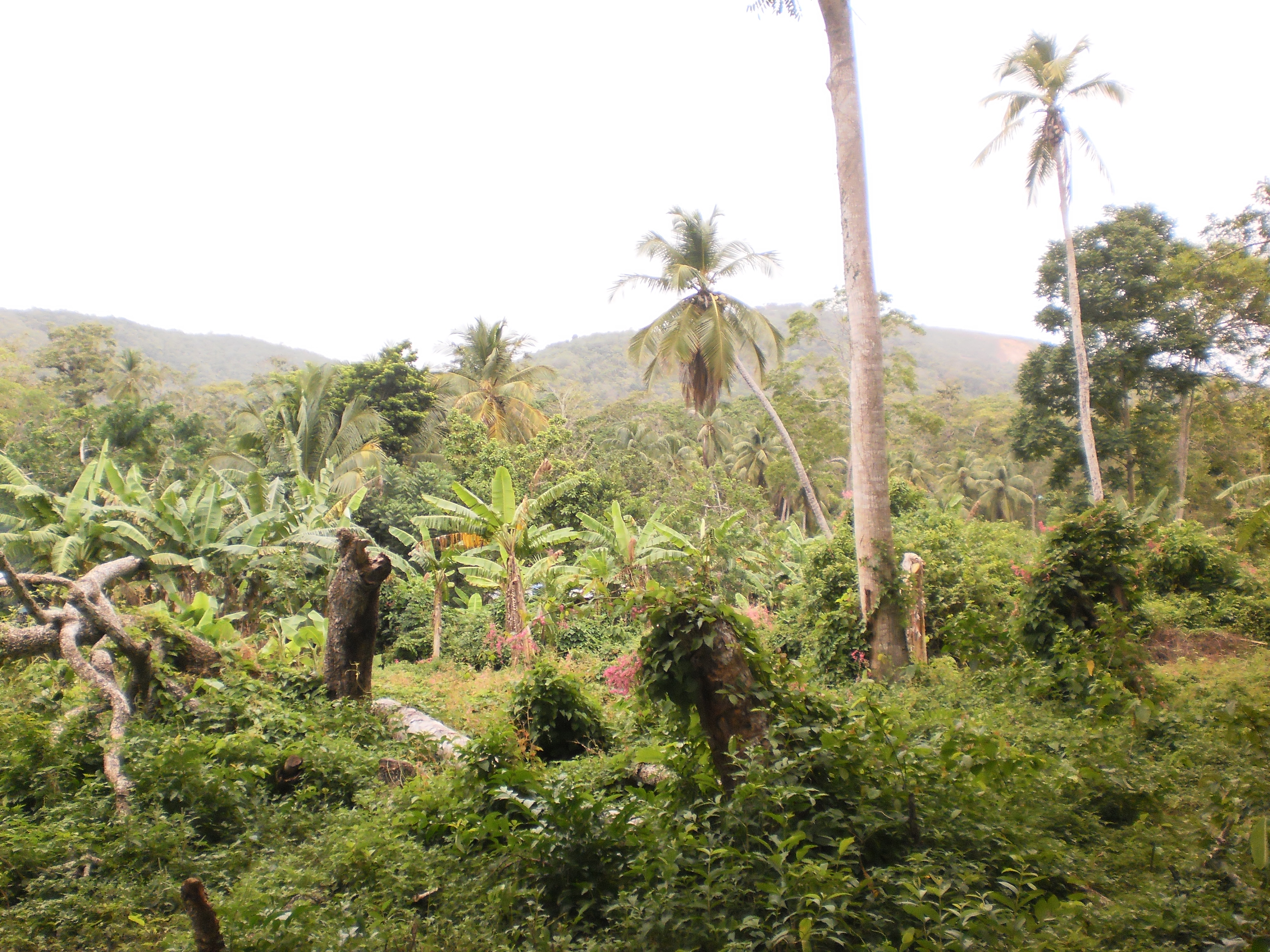
The exuberant vegetation

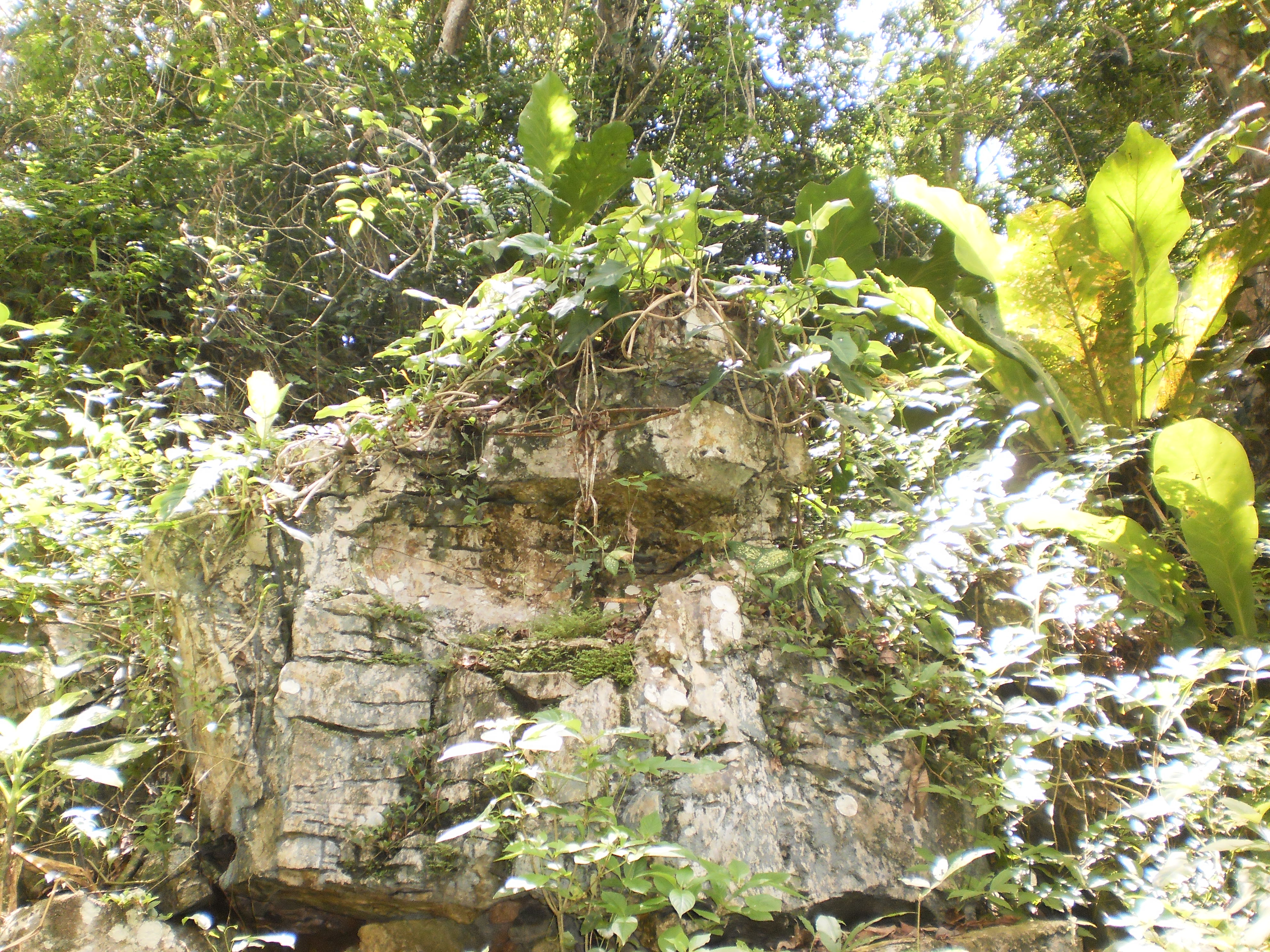
Cross of the stone

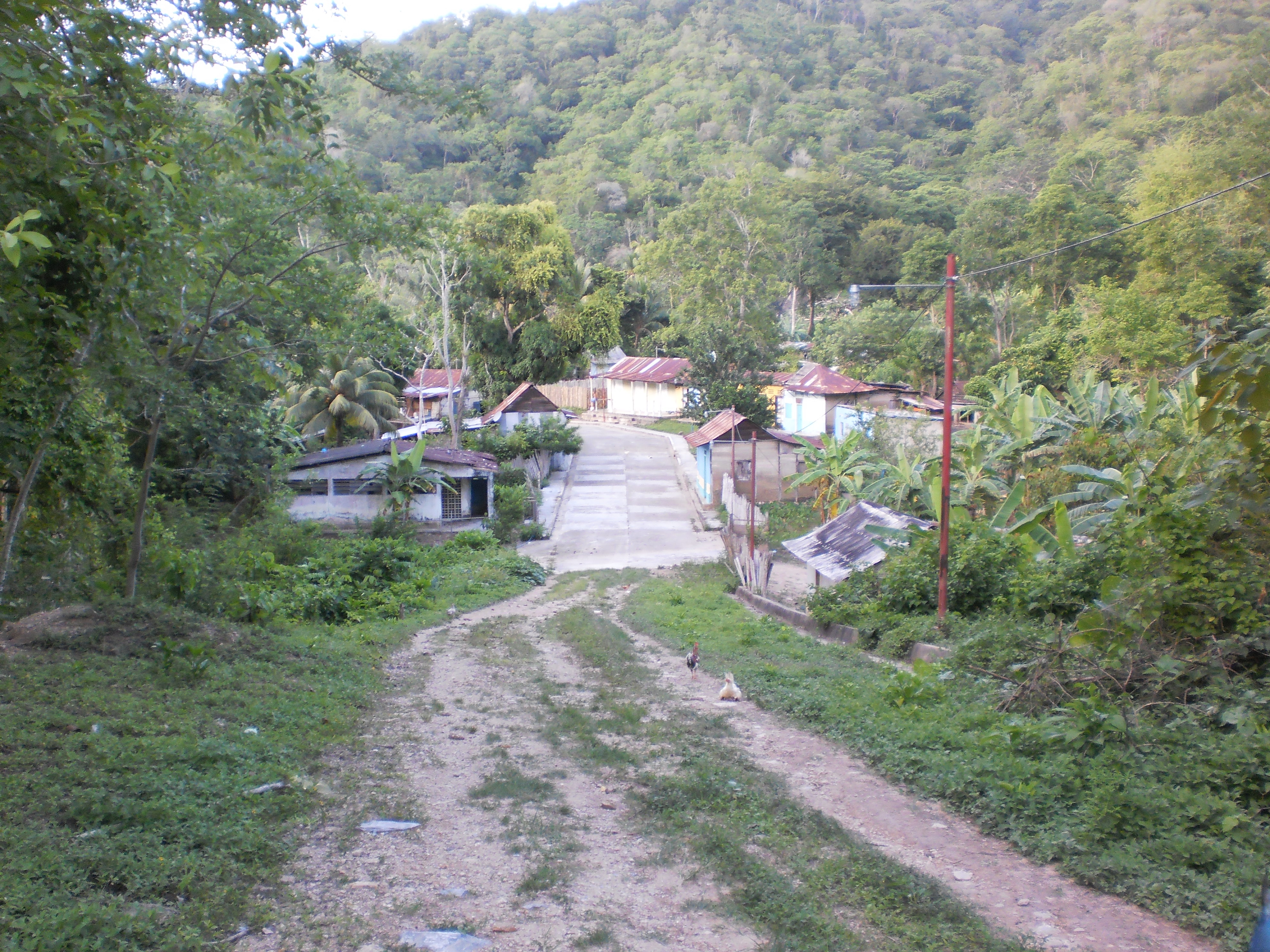
Descent to the town

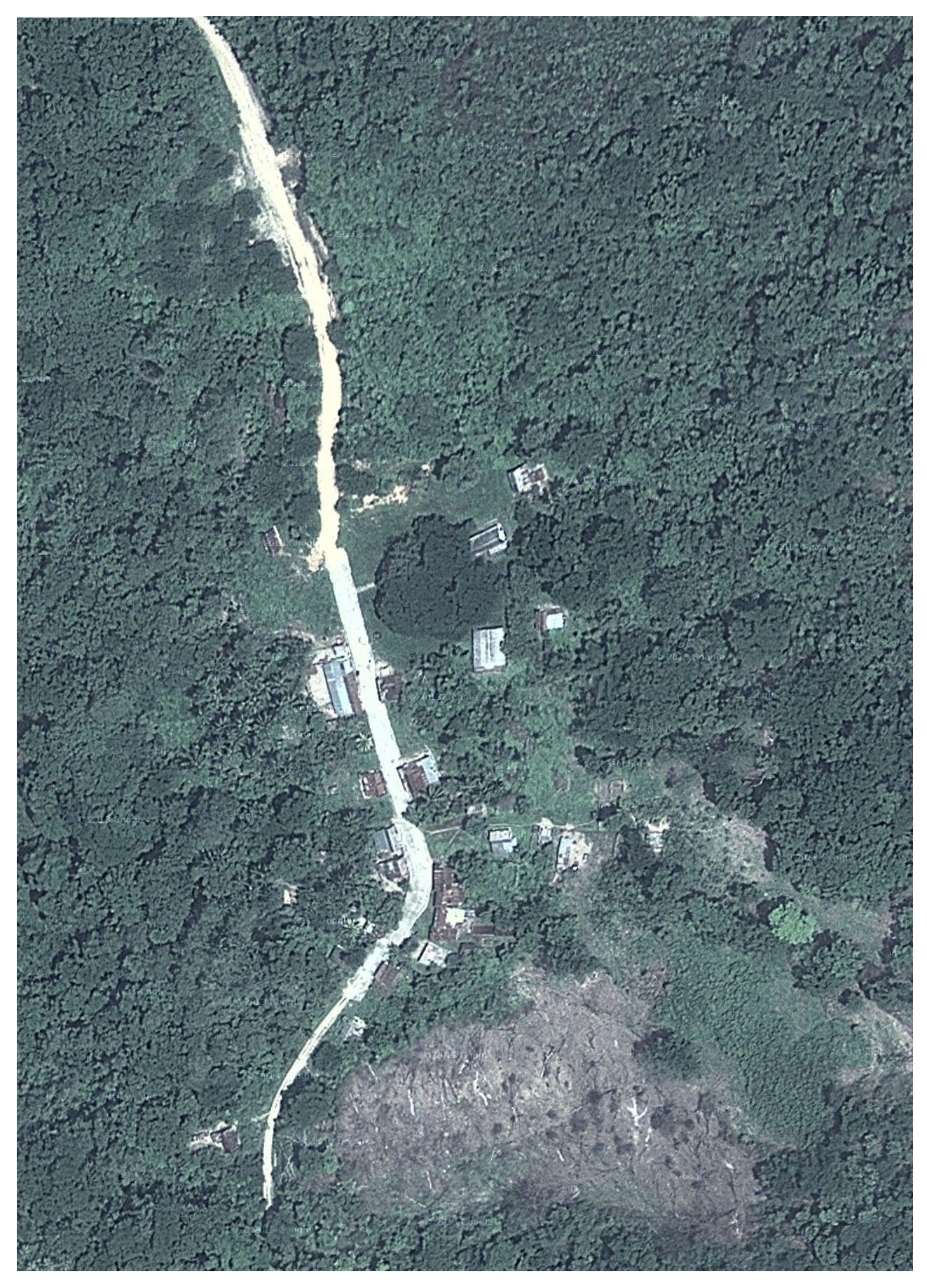
Map of greater Rio Grande de la Costa

== See also ==
- Sucre (state)
