= Plataforma Deltana =

Oil field between Trinidad & Tobago and Venezuela

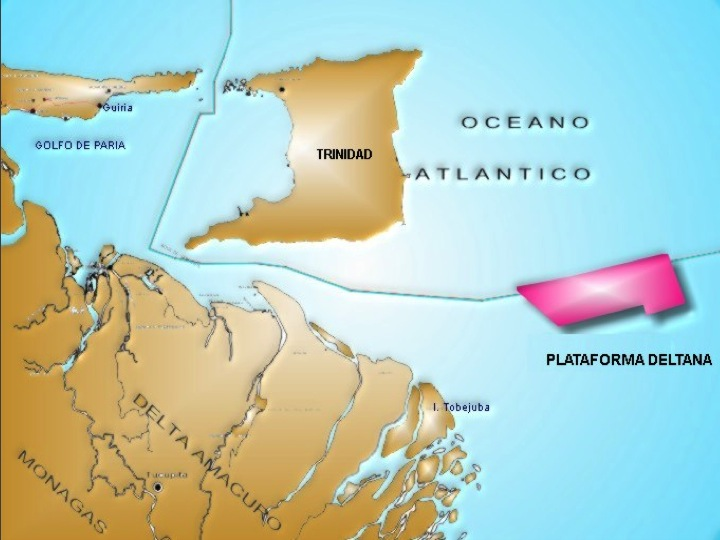
Fig. 1. Location

The Plataforma Deltana (English: Deltana Platform) is an offshore oil and gas field straddling the maritime borders of Trinidad and Tobago and Venezuela. It is located in the Orinoco delta, about 90 kilometers northeast of the island Tobejuba in the state Delta Amacuro, and approximately 233 kilometers southeast of Güiria, Sucre State, Venezuela.

== Water depths and topography of bottom ==
The water depths range from about 66 meters in the southwest up to 308 meters in the northeast, with an average slope of approximately 0.4% (0.25 grades) to the east-northeast. The relief of the seabed is generally irregular and includes frequent scarps related with faulting and erosion.

== Geology ==
The seabed in general is composed mainly of very soft clays. The geologic features in this area include normal faults with northwest-southeast orientation, a system of exposed and buried reefs that cross the area from the northwest toward the southeast, gas pockets trapped in faults and shallow strata at different levels of depth, paleo-channels, abrupt erosional slopes and scarps associated with submarine debris flows and faulting. Several side scan sonar targets are interpreted as scattered small debris.

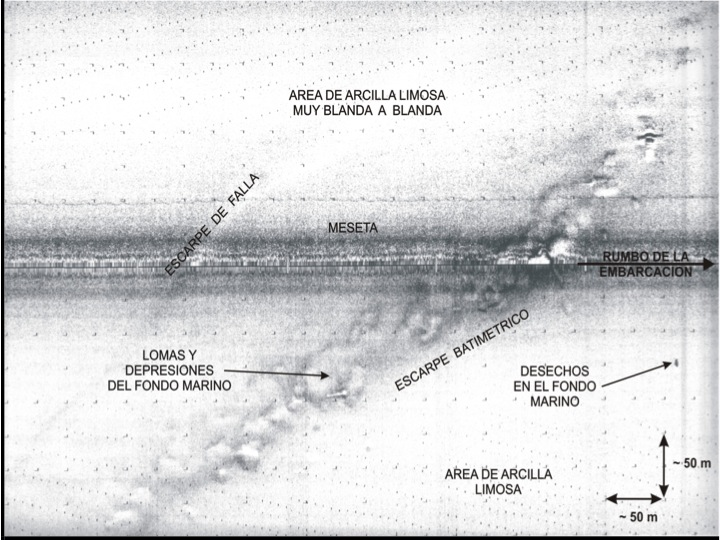
Side Scan Sonar 100 kHz. Deiros, D. (2002)

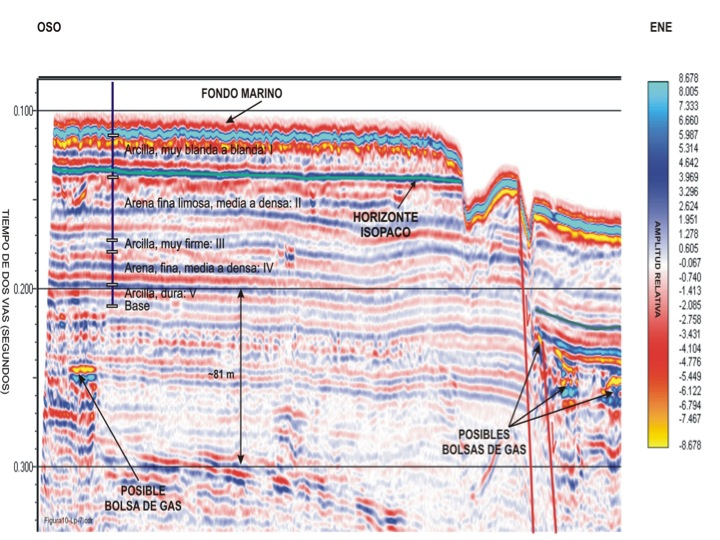
High resolution seismic showing the shallow stratigraphic and structural conditions. Deiros, D. (2002)

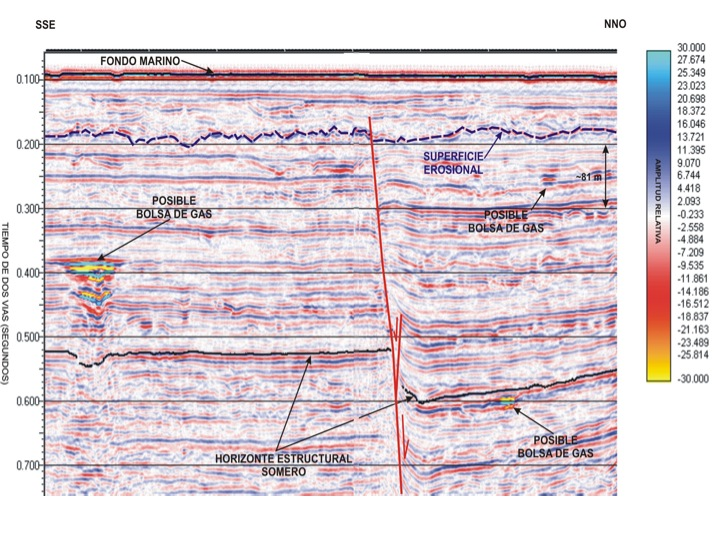
High resolution seismic showing gas pockets. Deiros, D. (2002)

== See also ==
- List of oil fields
