= Güiria Airport =

Juan Manuel Valdez Airport Güiria Airport
- IATA: GUI; ICAO: SVGI

Summary
- Airport type: Public
- Operator: Government
- Serves: Güiria, Venezuela
- Elevation AMSL: 42 ft (13 m)
- Coordinates: 10°34′25″N 62°18′45″W

Map
- Location of the airport in Venezuela

Runways
Direction	Length		Surface
Direction	m	ft	Surface
05/23	2,015	6,611	Asphalt
- Source: WAD GCM Google Maps

The Juan Manuel Valdez Airport or Güiria Airport (Spanish: Aeropuerto Juan Manuel Valdez), formerly known as Cristóbal Colón Airport, (IATA: GUI, ICAO: SVGI) is an airport serving Güiria, in the state of Sucre in Venezuela.

The Guiria non-directional beacon (Ident: GUI) is located on the field.

== See also ==
- Transport in Venezuela
- List of airports in Venezuela
