= Valdez Municipality =

Valdez Municipality Municipio Valdez
- Municipality
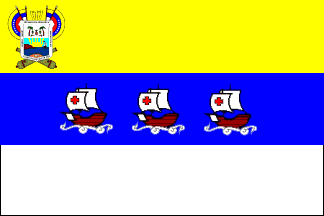
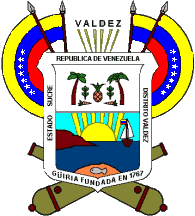
- Flag Coat of arms

- Location in Sucre

- Location in Venezuela
- Coordinates: 10°34′26″N 62°17′54″W
- Country: Venezuela
- State: Sucre
- Municipal seat: Güiria

Area
  - Total: 598 km^{2} (231 sq mi)
- Time zone: UTC−4 (VET)
- Website: Official website

Valdez is a municipality of Sucre State, Venezuela. It has four parishes, and the municipal seat is in Güiria. As of 2021, it has a population of 50,862.

== Localities ==
- Mapire, Peninsula de Paria
- Rio Grande de la Costa
