= Güiria =

- City
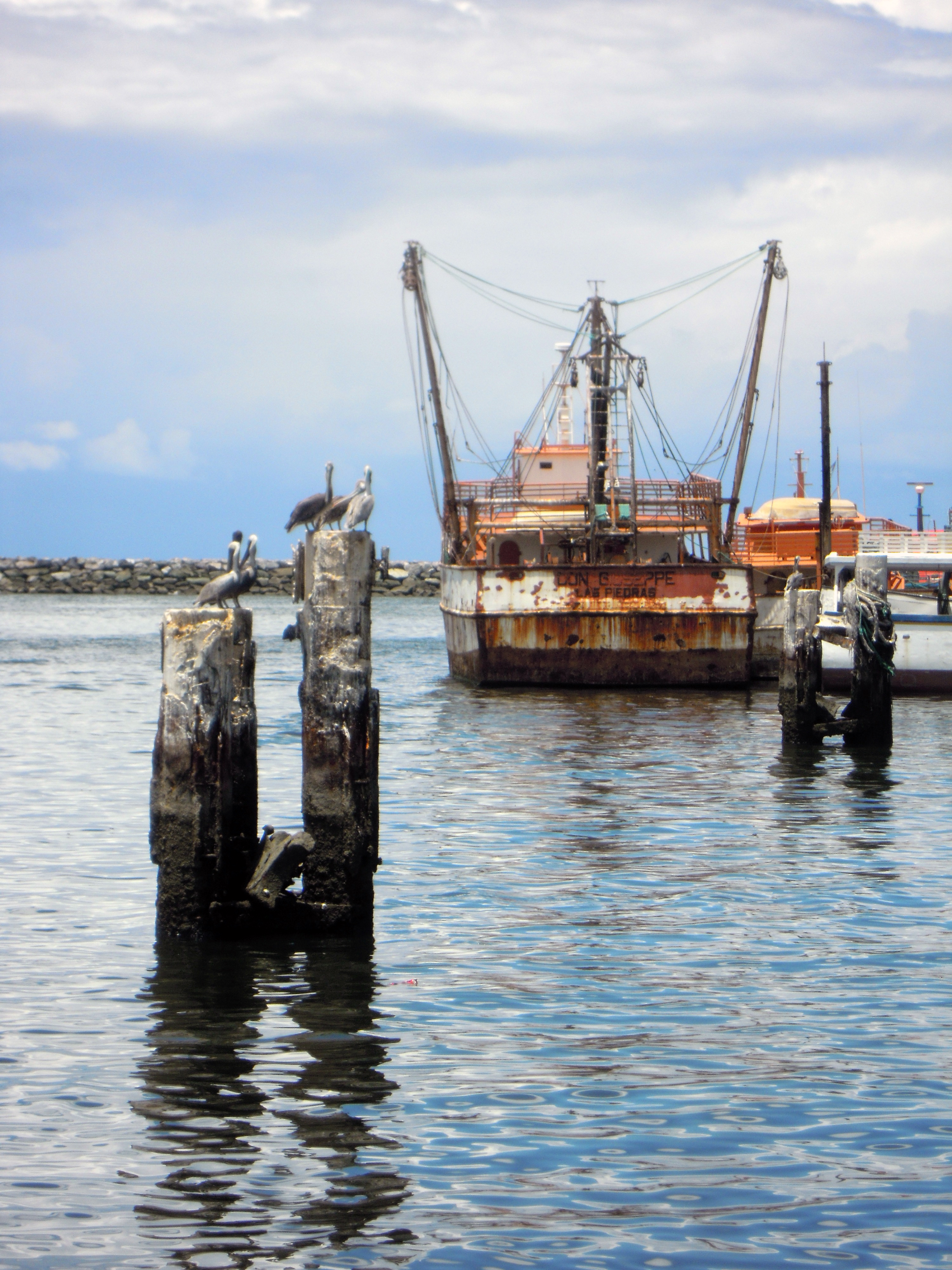
- Port of Güiria

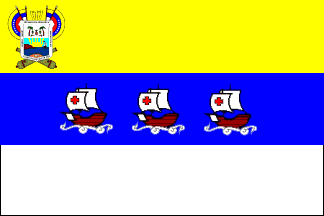
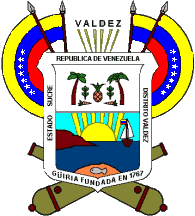
- Flag Coat of arms
- Nickname: Tierra de Gracia; English: Land of Grace
- Location within Venezuela
- Coordinates: 10°34′26″N 62°17′54″W
- Country: Venezuela
- State: Sucre
- Municipality: Valdez
- Founded: 8 December 1767

Government
  - Mayor: Régulo Sucre (PSUV)
- Elevation: 10 m (33 ft)

Population 2001 (INE projection)
  - Total: 40,000
  - Demonym: Guireño(a)
- Time zone: UTC-04:00 (VET)
- Postal code: 6161
- Area code: +58 294
- Climate: Aw

Güiria is the capital city of Valdez Municipality in the Venezuelan state of Sucre. Güiria was the place where the military campaign for South American independence set out to Upper Peru and also a starting point of the 1901 Venezuelan Civil War, also called the Liberating Revolution. Founded on 8 December 1767, Güiria is the state's third-largest urban centre, with a population of approximately 40,000. It is an important harbour, the only one in Venezuela located on the open Atlantic Ocean rather than on the Caribbean Sea, and the economic centre of Paria Peninsula, due to it being near the Gulf of Paria's natural gas fields, where several state and private companies have exploration projects.

== Climate ==
Güiria experiences a tropical savanna climate (Köppen: Aw), characterized by consistently hot temperatures and distinct wet and dry seasons.

Güiria has a wet season from May to November, while the dry season between January and April receives limited precipitation.

Climate data for Güiria (1991–2020)
Month	Jan	Feb	Mar	Apr	May	Jun	Jul	Aug	Sep	Oct	Nov	Dec	Year
Record high °C (°F)	38.3 (100.9)	35.3 (95.5)	35.6 (96.1)	38.1 (100.6)	34.9 (94.8)	37.8 (100.0)	38.3 (100.9)	36.0 (96.8)	39.2 (102.6)	39.7 (103.5)	38.4 (101.1)	35.9 (96.6)	39.7 (103.5)
Mean daily maximum °C (°F)	30.3 (86.5)	30.6 (87.1)	31.3 (88.3)	32.1 (89.8)	32.1 (89.8)	31.4 (88.5)	31.3 (88.3)	31.7 (89.1)	31.9 (89.4)	31.7 (89.1)	31.2 (88.2)	30.6 (87.1)	31.4 (88.5)
Daily mean °C (°F)	25.6 (78.1)	25.8 (78.4)	26.7 (80.1)	27.8 (82.0)	28.0 (82.4)	27.2 (81.0)	26.9 (80.4)	27.2 (81.0)	27.5 (81.5)	27.3 (81.1)	26.8 (80.2)	25.9 (78.6)	26.9 (80.4)
Mean daily minimum °C (°F)	21.5 (70.7)	21.6 (70.9)	22.6 (72.7)	24.1 (75.4)	24.7 (76.5)	24.4 (75.9)	24.1 (75.4)	24.5 (76.1)	24.6 (76.3)	24.4 (75.9)	23.9 (75.0)	22.6 (72.7)	23.6 (74.5)
Record low °C (°F)	14.8 (58.6)	15.2 (59.4)	9.3 (48.7)	19.4 (66.9)	19.0 (66.2)	20.7 (69.3)	19.8 (67.6)	19.9 (67.8)	19.0 (66.2)	19.1 (66.4)	18.7 (65.7)	17.7 (63.9)	9.3 (48.7)
Average precipitation mm (inches)	37.7 (1.48)	18.8 (0.74)	21.7 (0.85)	25.2 (0.99)	62.3 (2.45)	139.0 (5.47)	147.8 (5.82)	177.4 (6.98)	119.1 (4.69)	127.4 (5.02)	121.3 (4.78)	74.1 (2.92)	1,071.8 (42.20)
Average precipitation days (≥ 1.0 mm)	6.8	4.1	2.9	2.8	6.8	13.0	14.1	14.6	10.7	11.3	12.3	9.6	109.0
Source: NOAA

== Economy ==
The natural gas industry has been developed in Güiria by means of the Gran Mariscal de Ayacucho Industrial Complex (CIGMA), developed by Petróleos de Venezuela (PDVSA). The project's main goal is to promote the economic and industrial growth of Sucre state and to supply natural gas also to the states of Nueva Esparta, Monagas and Anzoátegui. It is planned to be connected in later stages to the nationwide gas distribution system to supply the rest of the country and for export.

Additionally, Güiria produces coconuts, cocoa, tobacco, tubers and fish. Cattle is also raised.

== Transportation ==
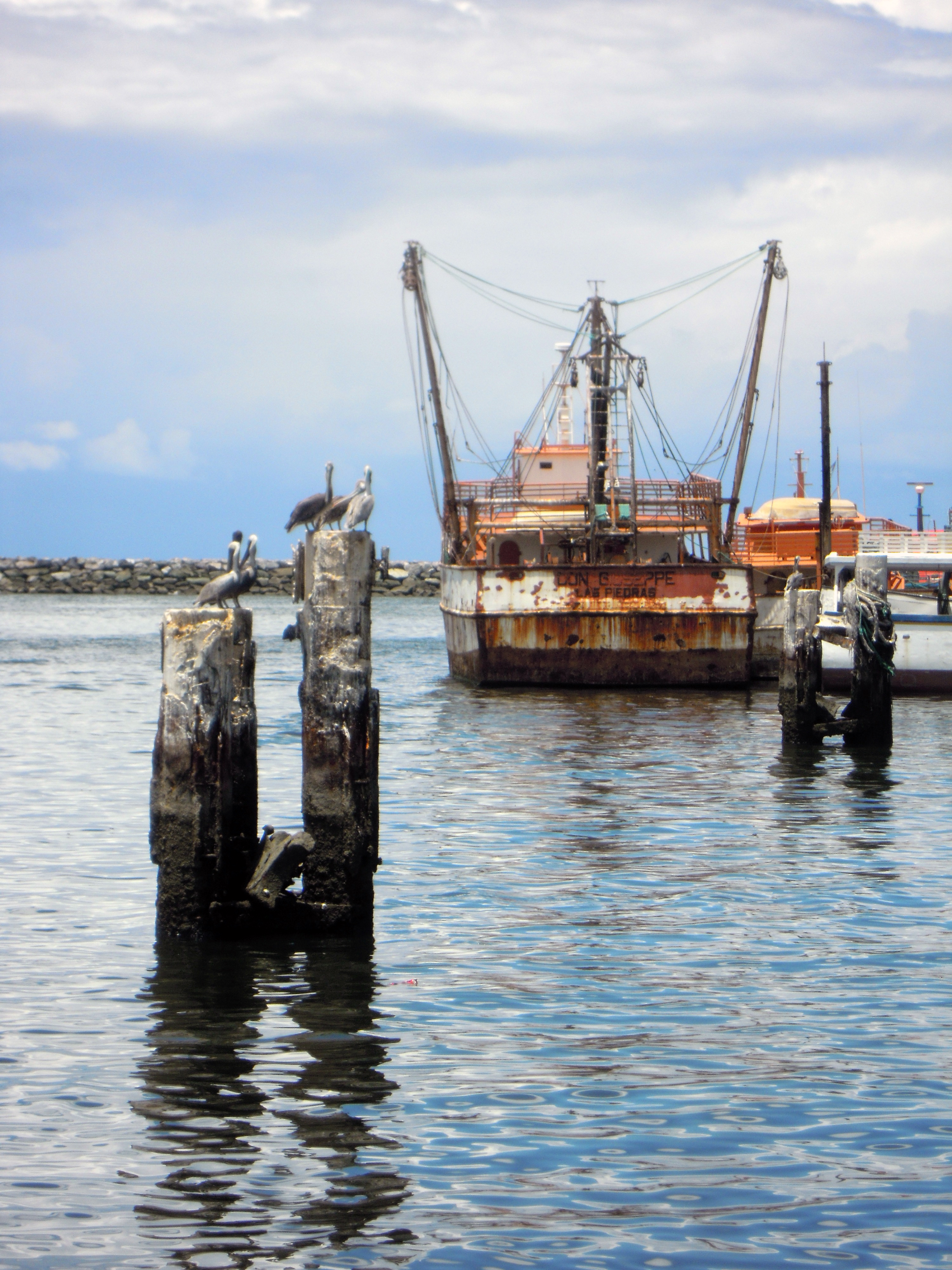
Port of Güiria.

- International Fishing Port of Güiria
- Cristóbal Colón Airport

Because Güiria is close to the island of Trinidad, there is significant maritime commerce with Trinidad and Tobago.

The Creole Petroleum Corporation operated a terminal for the loading of deep draft oil tankers from 1935 until 1948.

== Popular culture ==
Cricket is popular in Güiria. Steelpan music from Trinidad and Tobago can be heard in Güiria's carnival, as a cultural influence from the nearby islands.

Güiria has some typical dishes not found in usual Venezuelan cuisine, such as kalalu(callaloo), sauz (souse), pelau and domplina.

On 11 March 2012, Güiria was the landing point of the Atlantic Ocean crossing by Turkish American adventurer Erden Eruç in his Guinness world record setting solo human-powered circumnavigation of the earth, after rowing from Lüderitz, Namibia in about five months.
