= Saint Lucia livre =

The livre was the currency of Saint Lucia until 1814. The Saint Lucia livre was a French colonial currency, distinguished by the use of various cut Spanish and Spanish colonial coins. The livre was subdivided into 20 sous, each of 12 deniers. The escalin was worth 15 sous, with the stampee worth 3 sous, 9 denier (1/4 escalin). Until 1813, 12 escalins were equal to 8 reales (the Spanish dollar), after which 15 escalins equaled 8 reales. In 1851, sterling was introduced for circulation.

Since the late 19th century, dollars have circulated on Saint Lucia, first the Saint Lucia dollar, then the British West Indies dollar, and currently the East Caribbean dollar.

== Coins ==
In 1798, coins were issued for 2, 3, 4, and 6 escalins. These were made from sixths, quarters, thirds, and halves of 8 reales coins, on to which the letters "SL" were counterstamped.

The 1811 issue consisted of 3 stampee, 1, 1 1/2, and 2 escalin coins. The first two were made from quarters and thirds of 2 reales coins, whilst the higher two denominations were made from quarters and thirds of 4 reales coins. The 3 stampees were counterstamped with a crenulated circle, whilst the 1, 1 1/2, and 2 escalins were counterstamped with one, two, and three circles, respectively.

The final issue, from 1813, consisted of 3 and 9 escalins. These coins were produced by cutting 8 reales coins into three parts, with the two outer parts, each consisting of one fifth of the coin, making the 3 escalins, and the central part, consisting of three-fifths, making the 9 escalins. They were all counterstamped with "S:Lucie".
