= British West Indies dollar =

Currency in some British territories (1949–1965)

Demographics
- User(s): West Indies Federation; British Guiana
- This infobox shows the latest status before this currency was rendered obsolete.

The British West Indies dollar (BWI$) was the currency of British Guiana and the Eastern Caribbean territories of the British West Indies from 1949 to 1965, when it was largely replaced by the East Caribbean dollar, and was one of the currencies used in Jamaica from 1954 to 1964. The monetary policy of the currency was overseen by the British Caribbean Currency Board (BCCB). It was the official currency used by the West Indies Federation. The British West Indies dollar was never used in British Honduras, the Bahamas, or Bermuda.

== History ==
Queen Anne's proclamation of 1704 introduced the pound sterling currency system to the British West Indies; however it failed to displace the existing Spanish dollar currency system right up until the late 1870s. In 1822, the British government coined 1/4, 1/8, and 1/16 fractional 'Anchor dollars' for use in Mauritius and the British West Indies (but not Jamaica). A few years later copper fractional dollars were coined for Mauritius, Sierra Leone, and the British West Indies.

The next move to introduce British sterling silver coinage to the colonies came with an imperial order-in-council dated 1825. This move was inspired by a number of factors. The United Kingdom was now operating a very successful gold standard in relation to the gold sovereign that was introduced in 1816, and there was a desire to extend this system to the colonies. In addition to this, there was that the supply of Spanish dollars (pieces of eight) had been cut off as a result of the revolutions in Latin America where most of the Spanish dollars were minted. The last Spanish Dollar was in fact minted at Potosi in 1825. There was now a growing desire to have a stable and steady supply of British shillings everywhere where the British drum was beating. The 1825 order-in-council was largely a failure because it made sterling silver coinage legal tender at the unrealistic rating in relation to the Spanish dollar of $1 = 4 shillings and 4 pence. It did succeed in Jamaica, Bermuda, and British Honduras because the authorities in those territories set aside the official ratings and used the more realistic rating of $1 = 4 shillings. The reality of the rating between the dollar and the pound was based on the silver content of the Spanish pieces of eight as compared to the gold content of the British gold sovereign.

A second imperial order-in-council was passed in 1838 with the correct rating of $1 = 4 shillings 2 pence. In the years following the 1838 order-in-council, the British West Indies territories began to enact local legislation for the purposes of assimilating their monies of account with the British pound sterling. Gold discoveries in Australia in 1851 drove the silver dollar out of the West Indies, but it returned again with the great depreciation in the value of silver that followed with Germany's transition to the gold standard between 1871 and 1873. In the years immediately following 1873, there was a fear that the British West Indies might return to a silver standard. As such, legislation was passed in the individual territories to demonetize the silver dollars. Even though the British coinage was also silver, it represented fractions of the gold sovereign and so its value was based on a gold standard. During this period, and into the nineteenth century, accounts could be kept in either dollars or sterling. Jamaica, Bermuda, and the Bahamas preferred to use sterling accounts whereas British Guiana used dollar accounts. British Guiana used dollar accounts for the purpose of assisting in the transition from the Dutch guilder system of currency to the British pound sterling system. In the Eastern Caribbean territories the private sector preferred to use dollar accounts whereas the government preferred to use sterling accounts. In some of the Eastern Caribbean territories, notes were issued by various private banks, denominated in dollars equivalent to 4 shillings 2 pence. See Antigua dollar, Barbadian dollar, Dominican dollar, Grenadan dollar, Guyanese dollar, Saint Kitts dollar, Saint Lucia dollar, Saint Vincent dollar and Trinidad and Tobago dollar.

In 1946, a West Indian Currency Conference saw Barbados, British Guiana, the Leeward Islands, Trinidad and Tobago and the Windward Islands agree to establish a unified decimal currency system based on a West Indian dollar to replace the current arrangement of having three different Boards of Commissioners of Currency (for Barbados (which also served the Leeward and Windward Islands), British Guiana and Trinidad & Tobago).

In 1949, the British government formalized the dollar system of accounts in British Guiana and the Eastern Caribbean territories by introducing the British West Indies dollar (BWI$) at the already existing conversion rate of $4.80 per pound sterling (or $1 = 4 shillings 2 pence). It was one of the many experimental political and economic ventures tested by the British government to form a uniform system within their British West Indies territories. The currency was known verbally as the "Beewee" (slang for British West Indies) dollar. In 1950, the British Caribbean Currency Board (BCCB) was set up in Trinidad with the sole right to issue notes and coins of the new unified currency and given the mandate of keeping full foreign exchange cover to ensure convertibility at $4.80 per pound sterling. In 1951, the British Virgin Islands joined the arrangement, but this led to discontent because that territory was more naturally drawn to the currency of the neighbouring US Virgin Islands. In 1959, the British Virgin Islands withdrew from the arrangement and adopted the US dollar.

Until 1955, the BWI$ existed only as banknotes in conjunction with sterling fractional coinage. Decimal coins replaced the sterling coins in 1955. These decimal coins were denominated in cents, with each cent being worth one halfpenny in sterling.

In 1958, the West Indies Federation was established and the BWI$ was its currency. However, although Jamaica (including the Cayman Islands and the Turks and Caicos Islands) was part of the West Indies Federation, it retained the Jamaican pound, despite adopting the BWI$ as legal tender from 1954. Jamaica, the Cayman Islands, and the Turks and Caicos Islands were already long established users of the sterling accounts system of pounds, shillings, and pence.

In 1964 Jamaica ended the legal tender status of the BWI$ and Trinidad and Tobago withdrew from the currency union (adopting the Trinidad and Tobago dollar) forcing the movement of the headquarters of the BCCB from Trinidad to Barbados and soon the "BWI$" dollar lost its regional support.

In 1965, the British West Indies dollar of the now defunct West Indies Federation was replaced at par by the East Caribbean dollar and the BCCB was replaced by the Eastern Caribbean Currency Authority or ECCA (established by the Eastern Caribbean Currency Agreement 1965). British Guiana withdrew from the currency union the following year. Grenada rejoined the common currency arrangement in 1968 having utilized the Trinidad and Tobago dollar from 1964. Barbados withdrew from the currency union in 1972, following which the ECCA headquarters were moved to St. Kitts.

Between 1965 and 1983, the Eastern Caribbean Currency Authority issued the EC$, with banknotes from 1965 and coins from 1981. The EC$ is now issued by the Eastern Caribbean Central Bank, based in the city of Basseterre, in Saint Kitts and Nevis. The bank was established by an agreement (the Eastern Caribbean Central Bank Agreement) signed at Port of Spain on 5 July 1983.

The exchange rate of $4.80 = £1 sterling (equivalent to the old $1 = 4s 2d) continued right into up until 1976 for the new Eastern Caribbean dollar.

For a wider outline of the history of currency in the region see Currencies of the British West Indies.

== Coins ==
Coins were introduced in 1955 in denominations of 1/2, 1, 2, 5, 10, 25 and 50 cents, minted under the name of "British Caribbean Territories, Eastern Group". The 1/2, 1, and 2 cent coins were bronze and of the same weight and diameter as British farthing, halfpenny, and one penny coins. The 5 cents coin was brass while the 10, 25, and 50 cents were cupro-nickel. These coins remained in circulation until 1981, with the exception of the 1/2 cent, which was withdrawn in 1965. All coins bore the image of Queen Elizabeth II on the obverse.

== Banknotes ==
The first banknotes in the British West Indies were issued by private banks, including the Colonial Bank, Barclays Bank (which took over the Colonial Bank) and the Royal Bank of Canada. Issues were made at Antigua, Barbados, British Guiana, Dominica, Grenada, St. Kitts, St. Lucia, St. Vincent, and Trinidad and Tobago. The main feature of interest about these banknotes was that they displayed the dual accountancy system by stating the amount in both pounds sterling and in Spanish dollars at the automatic conversion rate of $1 = 4 shillings and 2 pence sterling.

There were also government issues for Barbados and British Guiana.

In 1950, the first issues made for all the participating colonies, in the name of the "British Caribbean Territories, Eastern Group". These were in denominations of 1, 2, 5, 10, 20 and 100 dollars. These notes replaced all earlier issues in 1951. The 1950-1951 issues bore the portrait of King George VI, with those between 1953 and 1964 bearing that of Queen Elizabeth II.

The serial number prefixes are located on the front of the note, and those of the King George VI series are fractional while those of the Queen Elizabeth II series are alphanumeric. The backs of all notes of both series are identical except for the color. Depicted are the Coat of Arms of the Leeward Islands and the Colonial Badges of British Guiana, Barbados, Windward Islands, and Trinidad & Tobago.

In March 1965, the East Caribbean Currency Authority (ECCA) was founded following the withdrawal from the British Caribbean Currency Board of British Guiana and Trinidad and Tobago to establish their respective central banks.

East Caribbean Territories Banknotes
Denomination	Colour	Front	Back	Size (mm)	Dates	Prefixes
$1	Red	Map of Caribbean on a scroll; King George VI	Coat of Arms and Colonial Badges	150 x 82	28 Nov 1950	A/1 - H/1
$1	Red	Map of Caribbean on a scroll; King George VI	Coat of Arms and Colonial Badges	150 x 82	01 Sep 1951	J/1 - L/1
$2	Blue	Map of Caribbean on a scroll; King George VI	Coat of Arms and Colonial Badges	150 x 82	28 Nov 1950	A/1 - C/1
$2	Blue	Map of Caribbean on a scroll; King George VI	Coat of Arms and Colonial Badges	150 x 82	01 Sep 1951	C/1 - D/1
$5	Green	Map of Caribbean on a scroll; King George VI	Coat of Arms and Colonial Badges	150 x 82	28 Nov 1950	A/1 - E/1
$5	Green	Map of Caribbean on a scroll; King George VI	Coat of Arms and Colonial Badges	150 x 82	01 Sep 1951	E/1 - H/1
$10	Brown	Map of Caribbean on a scroll; King George VI	Coat of Arms and Colonial Badges	150 x 82	28 Nov 1950	A/1
$10	Brown	Map of Caribbean on a scroll; King George VI	Coat of Arms and Colonial Badges	150 x 82	01 Sep 1951	B/1
$20	Purple	Map of Caribbean on a scroll; King George VI	Coat of Arms and Colonial Badges	150 x 82	28 Nov 1950	A/1
$20	Purple	Map of Caribbean on a scroll; King George VI	Coat of Arms and Colonial Badges	150 x 82	01 Sep 1951	A/1 - B/1
$100	Black	Map of Caribbean on a scroll; King George VI	Coat of Arms and Colonial Badges	150 x 82	28 Nov 1950	A/1
$100	Black	Map of Caribbean on a scroll; King George VI	Coat of Arms and Colonial Badges	150 x 82	01 Sep 1950	A/1
$1	Red	Map of Caribbean on a scroll; Queen Elizabeth II	Coat of Arms and Colonial Badges	150 x 82	05 Jan 1953	A2 - D2
$1	Red	Map of Caribbean on a scroll; Queen Elizabeth II	Coat of Arms and Colonial Badges	150 x 82	01 Mar 1954	D2 - J2
$1	Red	Map of Caribbean on a scroll; Queen Elizabeth II	Coat of Arms and Colonial Badges	150 x 82	03 Jan 1955	J2 - N2
$1	Red	Map of Caribbean on a scroll; Queen Elizabeth II	Coat of Arms and Colonial Badges	150 x 82	03 Jan 1956	N2 - U2
$1	Red	Map of Caribbean on a scroll; Queen Elizabeth II	Coat of Arms and Colonial Badges	150 x 82	02 Jan 1957	U2 - X2
$1	Red	Map of Caribbean on a scroll; Queen Elizabeth II	Coat of Arms and Colonial Badges	150 x 82	02 Jan 1958	Y2 - J3
$1	Red	Map of Caribbean on a scroll; Queen Elizabeth II	Coat of Arms and Colonial Badges	150 x 82	02 Jan 1959	J3 - N3
$1	Red	Map of Caribbean on a scroll; Queen Elizabeth II	Coat of Arms and Colonial Badges	150 x 82	01 Jul 1960	N3 - S3
$1	Red	Map of Caribbean on a scroll; Queen Elizabeth II	Coat of Arms and Colonial Badges	150 x 82	02 Jan 1961	S3 - X3
$1	Red	Map of Caribbean on a scroll; Queen Elizabeth II	Coat of Arms and Colonial Badges	150 x 82	02 Jan 1962	Y3 - K4
$1	Red	Map of Caribbean on a scroll; Queen Elizabeth II	Coat of Arms and Colonial Badges	150 x 82	02 Jan 1963	K4 - N4
$1	Red	Map of Caribbean on a scroll; Queen Elizabeth II	Coat of Arms and Colonial Badges	150 x 82	02 Jan 1964	N4 - T4
$2	Blue	Map of Caribbean on a scroll; Queen Elizabeth II	Coat of Arms and Colonial Badges	150 x 82	05 Jan 1953	A2 - B2
$2	Blue	Map of Caribbean on a scroll; Queen Elizabeth II	Coat of Arms and Colonial Badges	150 x 82	01 Mar 1954	C2 - D2
$2	Blue	Map of Caribbean on a scroll; Queen Elizabeth II	Coat of Arms and Colonial Badges	150 x 82	03 Jan 1955	E2
$2	Blue	Map of Caribbean on a scroll; Queen Elizabeth II	Coat of Arms and Colonial Badges	150 x 82	03 Jan 1956	E2 - G2
$2	Blue	Map of Caribbean on a scroll; Queen Elizabeth II	Coat of Arms and Colonial Badges	150 x 82	02 Jan 1957	G2 - J2
$2	Blue	Map of Caribbean on a scroll; Queen Elizabeth II	Coat of Arms and Colonial Badges	150 x 82	02 Jan 1958	J2 - M2
$2	Blue	Map of Caribbean on a scroll; Queen Elizabeth II	Coat of Arms and Colonial Badges	150 x 82	02 Jan 1959	M2 - N2
$2	Blue	Map of Caribbean on a scroll; Queen Elizabeth II	Coat of Arms and Colonial Badges	150 x 82	01 Jul 1960	N2 - P2
$2	Blue	Map of Caribbean on a scroll; Queen Elizabeth II	Coat of Arms and Colonial Badges	150 x 82	02 Jan 1961	Q2 - S2
$2	Blue	Map of Caribbean on a scroll; Queen Elizabeth II	Coat of Arms and Colonial Badges	150 x 82	02 Jan 1962	S2 - V2
$2	Blue	Map of Caribbean on a scroll; Queen Elizabeth II	Coat of Arms and Colonial Badges	150 x 82	02 Jan 1963	V2 - X2
$2	Blue	Map of Caribbean on a scroll; Queen Elizabeth II	Coat of Arms and Colonial Badges	150 x 82	02 Jan 1964	X2 - Y2
$5	Green	Map of Caribbean on a scroll; Queen Elizabeth II	Coat of Arms and Colonial Badges	150 x 82	05 Jan 1953	A2 - B2
$5	Green	Map of Caribbean on a scroll; Queen Elizabeth II	Coat of Arms and Colonial Badges	150 x 82	03 Jan 1955	C2 - D2
$5	Green	Map of Caribbean on a scroll; Queen Elizabeth II	Coat of Arms and Colonial Badges	150 x 82	03 Jan 1956	D2 - E2
$5	Green	Map of Caribbean on a scroll; Queen Elizabeth II	Coat of Arms and Colonial Badges	150 x 82	02 Jan 1957	F2 - J2
$5	Green	Map of Caribbean on a scroll; Queen Elizabeth II	Coat of Arms and Colonial Badges	150 x 82	02 Jan 1958	J2 - M2
$5	Green	Map of Caribbean on a scroll; Queen Elizabeth II	Coat of Arms and Colonial Badges	150 x 82	02 Jan 1959	N2
$5	Green	Map of Caribbean on a scroll; Queen Elizabeth II	Coat of Arms and Colonial Badges	150 x 82	02 Jan 1961	P2 - R2
$5	Green	Map of Caribbean on a scroll; Queen Elizabeth II	Coat of Arms and Colonial Badges	150 x 82	02 Jan 1962	R2 - T2
$5	Green	Map of Caribbean on a scroll; Queen Elizabeth II	Coat of Arms and Colonial Badges	150 x 82	02 Jan 1963	T2 - V2
$5	Green	Map of Caribbean on a scroll; Queen Elizabeth II	Coat of Arms and Colonial Badges	150 x 82	02 Jan 1964	V2 - W2
$10	Brown	Map of Caribbean on a scroll; Queen Elizabeth II	Coat of Arms and Colonial Badges	150 x 82	05 Jan 1953	A2
$10	Brown	Map of Caribbean on a scroll; Queen Elizabeth II	Coat of Arms and Colonial Badges	150 x 82	03 Jan 1955	A2
$10	Brown	Map of Caribbean on a scroll; Queen Elizabeth II	Coat of Arms and Colonial Badges	150 x 82	03 Jan 1956	A2 - B2
$10	Brown	Map of Caribbean on a scroll; Queen Elizabeth II	Coat of Arms and Colonial Badges	150 x 82	02 Jan 1957	C2
$10	Brown	Map of Caribbean on a scroll; Queen Elizabeth II	Coat of Arms and Colonial Badges	150 x 82	02 Jan 1958	C2 - D2
$10	Brown	Map of Caribbean on a scroll; Queen Elizabeth II	Coat of Arms and Colonial Badges	150 x 82	02 Jan 1959	D2 - E2
$10	Brown	Map of Caribbean on a scroll; Queen Elizabeth II	Coat of Arms and Colonial Badges	150 x 82	02 Jan 1961	E2
$10	Brown	Map of Caribbean on a scroll; Queen Elizabeth II	Coat of Arms and Colonial Badges	150 x 82	02 Jan 1962	E2 - H2
$10	Brown	Map of Caribbean on a scroll; Queen Elizabeth II	Coat of Arms and Colonial Badges	150 x 82	02 Jan 1963	H2
$10	Brown	Map of Caribbean on a scroll; Queen Elizabeth II	Coat of Arms and Colonial Badges	150 x 82	02 Jan 1964	J2
$20	Purple	Map of Caribbean on a scroll; Queen Elizabeth II	Coat of Arms and Colonial Badges	150 x 82	05 Jan 1953	A2
$20	Purple	Map of Caribbean on a scroll; Queen Elizabeth II	Coat of Arms and Colonial Badges	150 x 82	03 Jan 1955	A2
$20	Purple	Map of Caribbean on a scroll; Queen Elizabeth II	Coat of Arms and Colonial Badges	150 x 82	02 Jan 1957	A2
$20	Purple	Map of Caribbean on a scroll; Queen Elizabeth II	Coat of Arms and Colonial Badges	150 x 82	02 Jan 1959	A2 - B2
$20	Purple	Map of Caribbean on a scroll; Queen Elizabeth II	Coat of Arms and Colonial Badges	150 x 82	02 Jan 1961	C2
$20	Purple	Map of Caribbean on a scroll; Queen Elizabeth II	Coat of Arms and Colonial Badges	150 x 82	02 Jan 1962	D2
$20	Purple	Map of Caribbean on a scroll; Queen Elizabeth II	Coat of Arms and Colonial Badges	150 x 82	02 Jan 1963	E2
$20	Purple	Map of Caribbean on a scroll; Queen Elizabeth II	Coat of Arms and Colonial Badges	150 x 82	02 Jan 1964	E2
$100	Black	Map of Caribbean on a scroll; Queen Elizabeth II	Coat of Arms and Colonial Badges	150 x 82	05 Jan 1953	A2
$100	Black	Map of Caribbean on a scroll; Queen Elizabeth II	Coat of Arms and Colonial Badges	150 x 82	01 Mar 1954	A2
$100	Black	Map of Caribbean on a scroll; Queen Elizabeth II	Coat of Arms and Colonial Badges	150 x 82	02 Jan 1957	A2
$100	Black	Map of Caribbean on a scroll; Queen Elizabeth II	Coat of Arms and Colonial Badges	150 x 82	02 Jan 1963	A2

== See also ==
- Currencies of the British West Indies
