= Holey dollar =

19th-century British colonial coinage

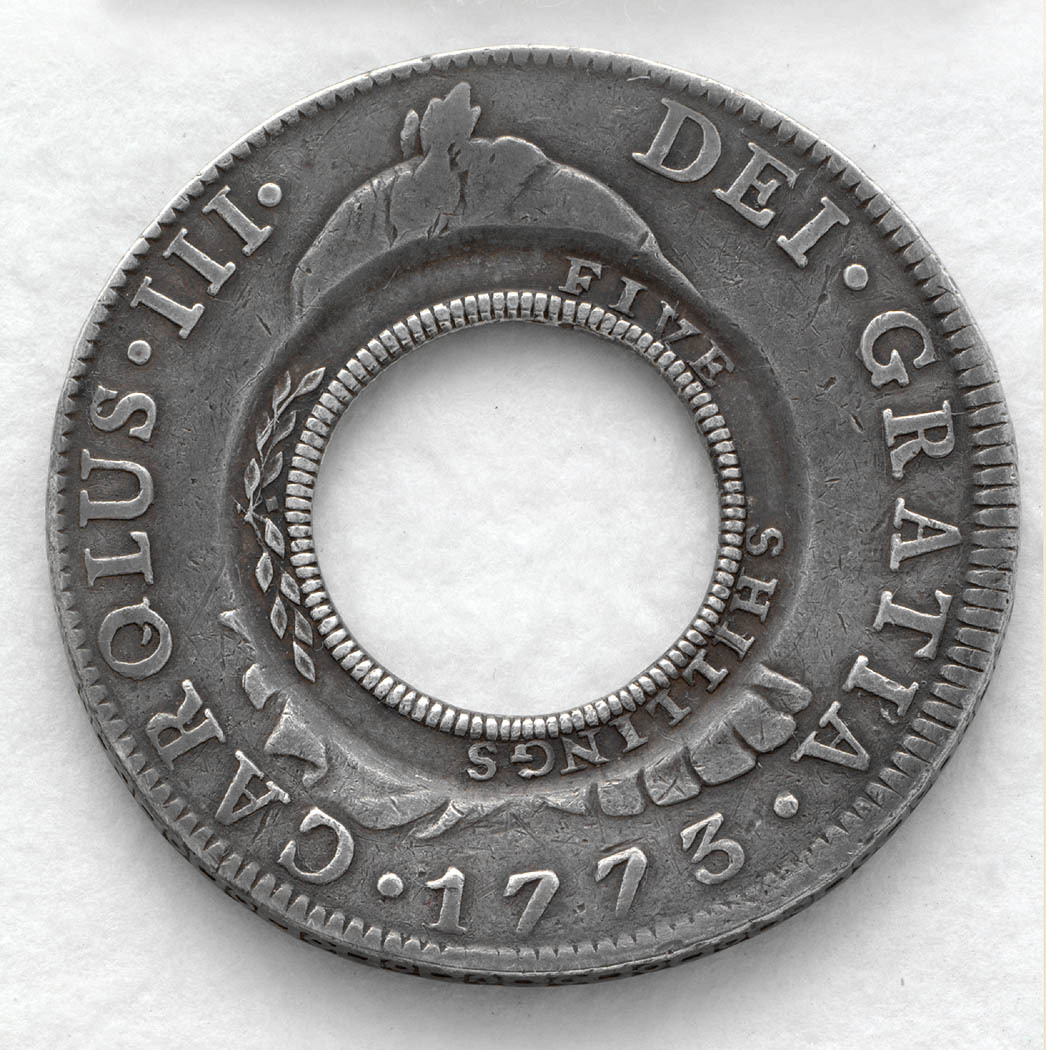
A New South Wales "holey dollar", the first distinct currency of Australia

Holey dollar is the name given to coins used in the early history of two British settlements: Prince Edward Island (now part of Canada) and New South Wales (now part of Australia). The middle was punched out of Spanish dollars, creating two parts: a small coin, known as a "dump" in Australia, and a "holey dollar". This was one of the first coins struck in Australia.

== Spanish dollar ==
From 1497, the Spanish government started to mint a large silver coin that, through wide circulation, became known as the Spanish dollar. It was also known as the peso of eight reales, or Piece of eight royals.

== Prince Edward Island (Canada) ==
Around the end of the 18th century, the Spanish dollar was in constant circulation in Eastern Canada and the United States. The value of the coin varied in different centres but was highest in Halifax. Therefore, whenever the merchants of Prince Edward Island (PEI) secured them, they sent them to Halifax to take advantage of the higher rate. The resulting shortage of money in PEI prompted governor Charles Douglass Smith in 1813 to gather in all the Spanish dollars he could and have their centres punched out, whereupon the central plug and rims were stamped with a sunburst. The punched centres passed as shillings and the outer rims as five-shilling pieces. The combined value of the mutilated coins was thereafter 20 per cent greater in PEI than outside the island (and the individual components less valuable), so as a consequence, the coins became the official currency in PEI.

Prince Edward Island Spanish Holey Dollar and punched centre – 1813
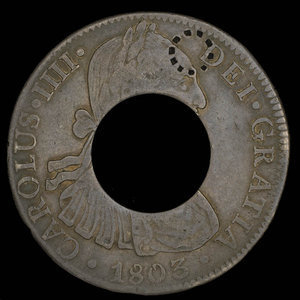
Dollar obverse

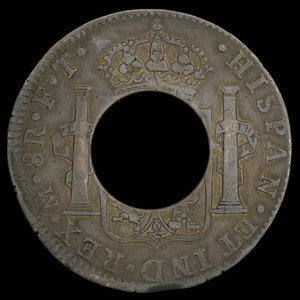
Dollar reverse

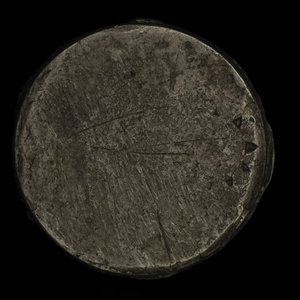
Punched centre

== British colony of New South Wales (Australia) ==
When the colony of New South Wales was founded in 1788, it ran into the problem of a lack of coinage. Foreign coins – including British, Dutch, Indian and Portuguese – were common in its early years, but much of this coinage left the colony by way of trade with visiting merchant ships. Barter was a necessity amongst the colonists, with the most popular, rum, becoming an unofficial currency. One of the first attempts to restrict the practice was by Governor King, who on 19 November 1800 set an arbitrary price for foreign coinage, but there was never enough of it. To try and resolve the shortage, he requested the supply of sixpences to be used as shillings, but failed to get a hearing. The practice of using rum as a currency was prohibited by Governor Bligh in 1806, eventually culminating in the overthrow of the government in the Rum Rebellion.

To overcome this shortage of coins, Governor Lachlan Macquarie took the initiative of using £10,000 in Spanish dollars sent by the British government to produce suitable coins in a similar manner to that described above. These coins to the value of 40,000 Spanish dollars came on 26 November 1812 on HMS Samarang from Madras, via the East India Company.

With the shipment of currency were strict instructions to prevent the newly arrived coinage from leaving the country, so after consultation with the Judge Advocate and other officials, Governor Macquarie had a convicted forger named William Henshall cut the centres out of the coins and counter stamp them, thus making them useless outside the colony. The central plug (known as a dump) was valued at 15 pence (i.e., 1 shilling, 3 pence, or 1s 3d), and was restruck with a new design (a crown on the obverse, the denomination on the reverse), whilst the holey dollar received an overstamp around the hole ("New South Wales 1813" on the obverse, "Five Shillings" on the reverse). This distinguished the coins as belonging to the colony of New South Wales, creating the first official currency produced specifically for circulation in NSW. The combined nominal value in NSW of the holey dollar and the dump was 6s 3d (6 shillings, 3 pence), or 25 per cent more than the value of a Spanish dollar; this made it unprofitable to export the coins from the colony.

The project to convert the 40,000 Spanish coins took over a year to complete. Of the 40,000 Spanish dollars imported, 39,910 holey dollars and 39,910 dumps were made, with the balance assumed to have been spoiled during the conversion process. On 1 July 1813 Governor Macquarie issued a proclamation "that the said Silver Money shall be a legal Tender" and that set their value. The converted coins went into circulation in 1814.

From 1822 the government began to recall the coins and replace them with sterling coinage. By the time the holey dollar was finally demonetised in 1829, most of the 40,000 coins in circulation had been exchanged for legal tender and melted down into bullion. Experts estimate that only 350 holey dollars and 1500 dumps remain. The rarity of the Australian holey dollar ensures that even those in relatively poor condition are valuable. There are many stories of holey dollars being found in unusual circumstances.

One of the most notable holey dollars is the Hannibal Head, a one of a kind coin that features the portrait of King Joseph I of Spain. It was found in 1881 alongside other holey dollars in what is believed to be a Bushrangers hoard in Tasmania and has since been held in private collections. The coin was sold in 2018 at the Eminent colonial auctions through Coinworks, valued at an estimated $450,000 and sold to a private collector for $500,000.

NSW Holey Dollar and dump in State Library of New South Wales collection
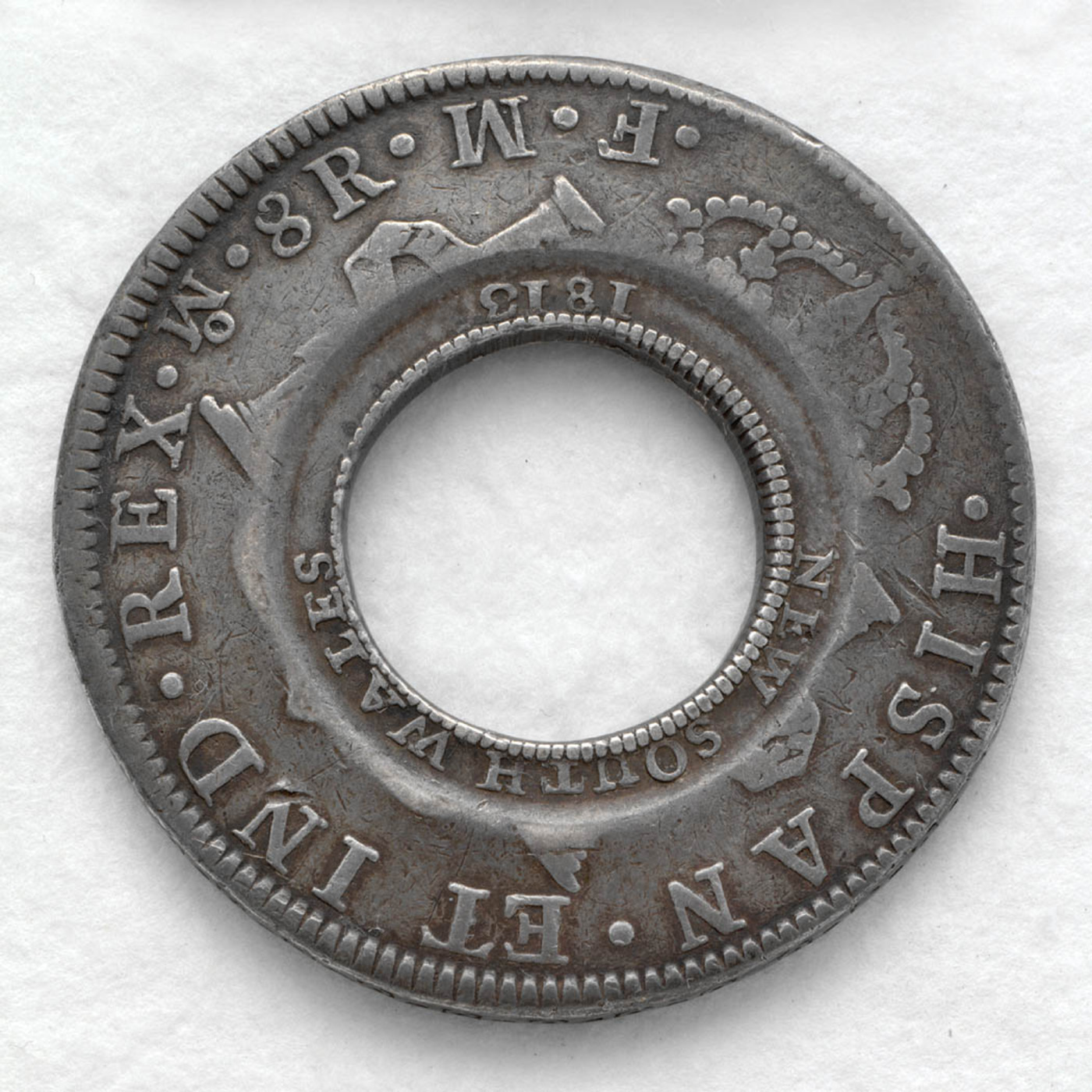
Dollar obverse

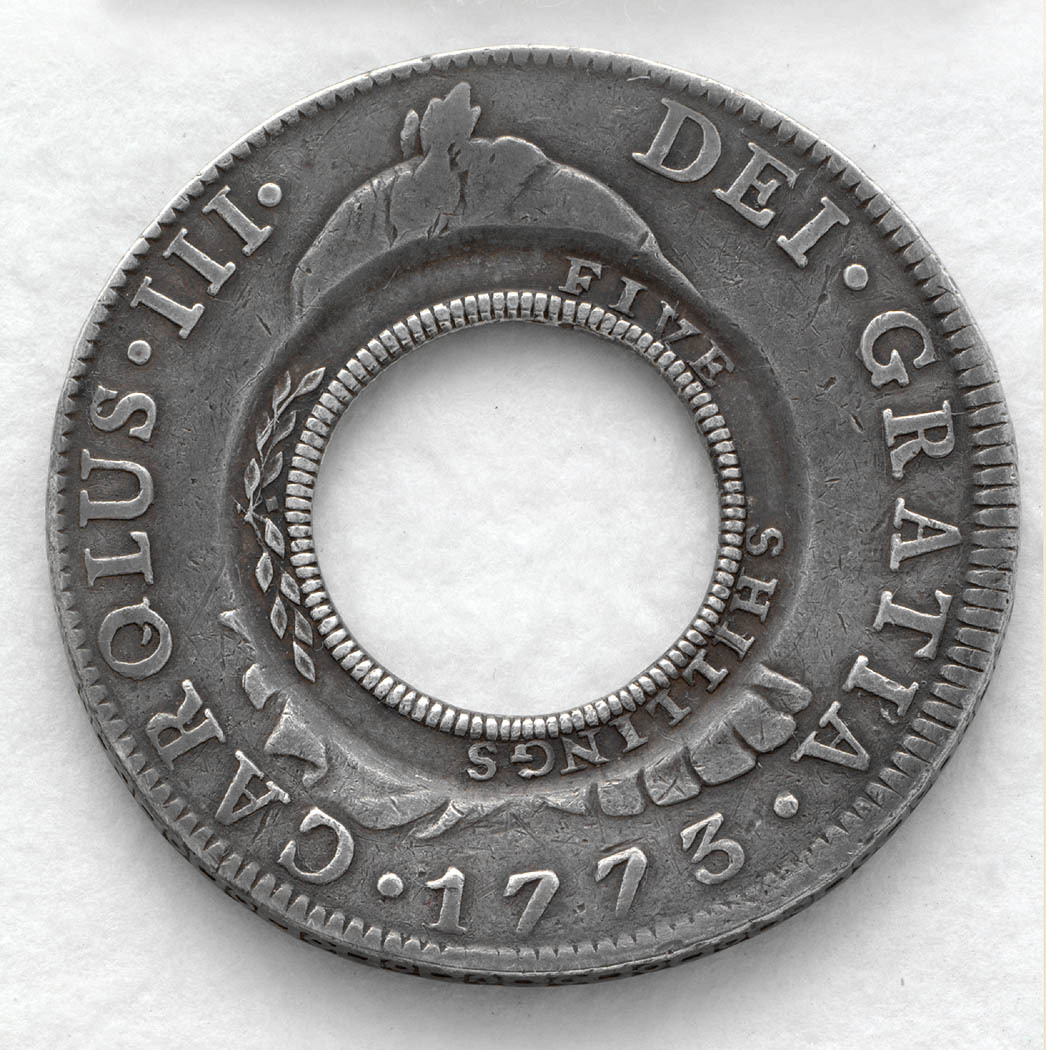
Dollar reverse

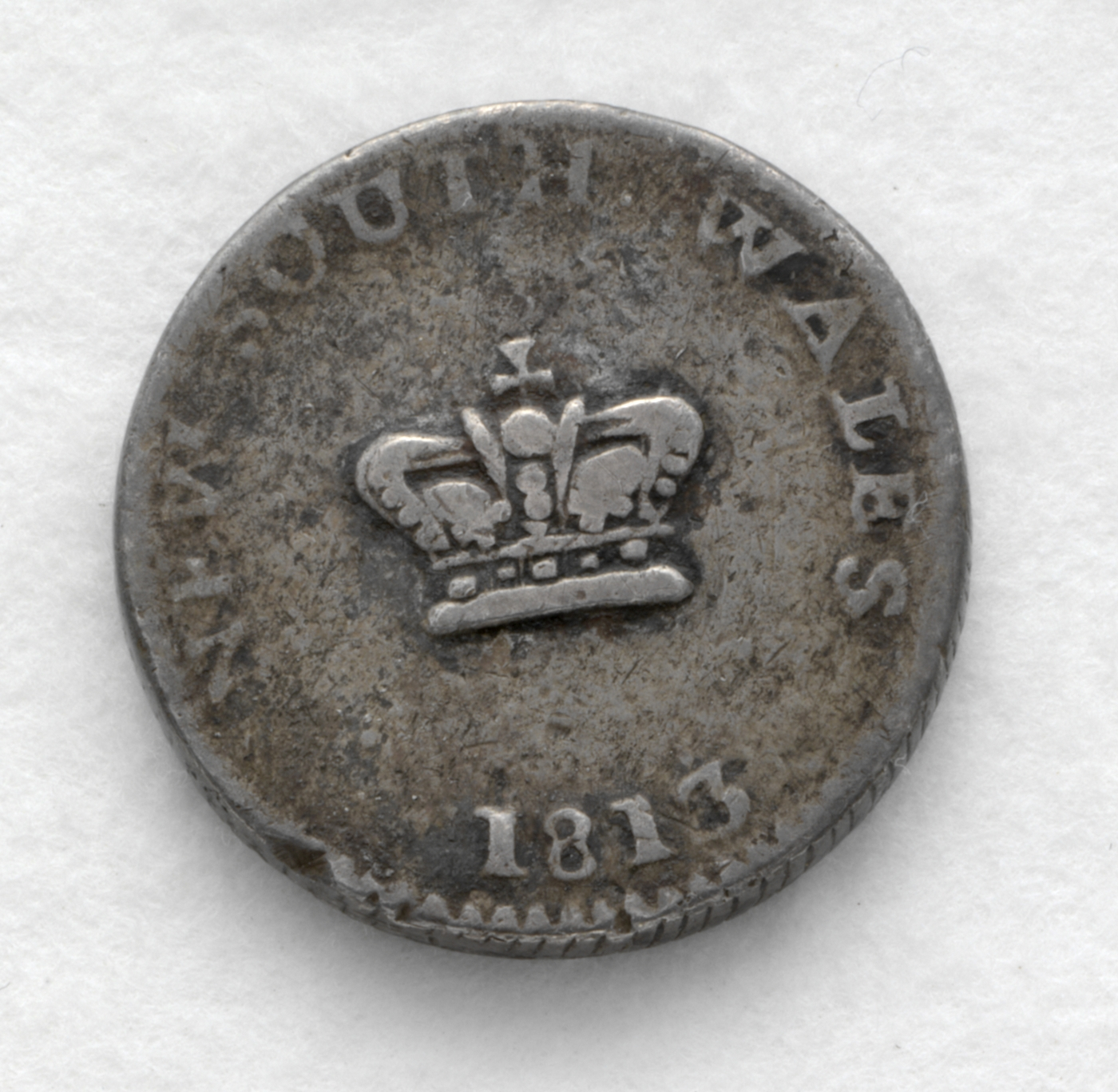
Dump obverse

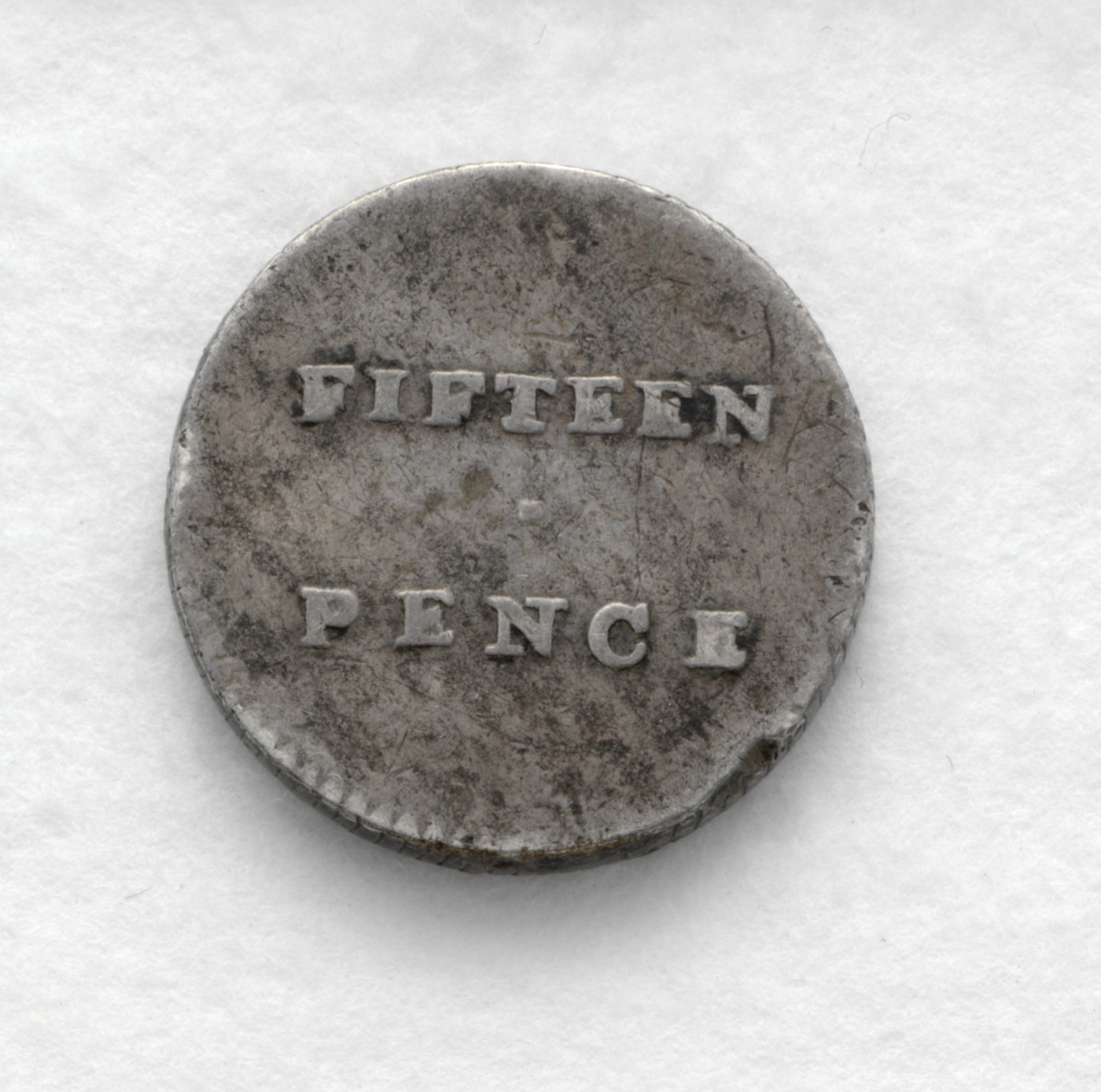
Dump reverse

The holey dollar is the logo for the Macquarie Group, an Australian investment bank.

== Similar coins ==
Although not known as "holey dollars", several British colonies in the Caribbean used the same method for producing coins from Spanish dollars. They include British Guiana, Dominica, Grenada, Guadeloupe, Saint Vincent, Tobago and Trinidad. The holed coins and plugs circulated alongside various other coins made by cutting Spanish and Spanish colonial coins into sections. These coinages were denominated in either shillings and pence or bits, worth nine pence. (One dollar was made up of eight bits. At 9d the bit, this meant that the eight bits were worth 6s in their markets, or 20 per cent more than a Spanish dollar.)

== Principality of Hutt River ==
The Principality of Hutt River issued a commemorative $1 coin in 1977 to commemorate Queen Elizabeth II's Silver Jubilee. In 1978, another issue of the Hutt River Province Principality's $1 coins was issued. This has no commemorative inscription. These coins are also known to numismatists as holey dollars.

== See also ==
- Dominican dollar
- Grenadan dollar
- Saint Vincent dollar
