= Currencies of the British West Indies =

The region known as the British West Indies included British Guiana on the South American mainland, British Honduras in Central America, Bermuda, The Bahamas, and Jamaica, along with its former dependencies of the Cayman Islands and the Turks and Caicos Islands. It also included the Eastern Caribbean territories of Trinidad and Tobago, Barbados, the Windward Islands and the Leeward Islands.

From the early 19th century to the later 20th century, the region generally used sterling coinage, although there was quite widespread usage of mixed sterling and dollar accounts. In the later 20th century there was a move towards dollar accounts in all the territories, in conjunction with the introduction of decimal fractional coinage.

== Early history ==
Queen Anne's proclamation of 1704 the first attempt to introduce the pound sterling currency system to the British West Indies; however it failed to displace the existing Spanish dollar currency system right up until the great silver devaluation of 1873. In addition to the Spanish dollars and gold doubloons, the British government coined 1/4, 1/8, and 1/16 fractional "Anchor dollars" in 1822, for use in Mauritius and the British West Indies, but not including Jamaica.

The next move to introduce British sterling silver coinage to the colonies came with an imperial order in council dated 1825. This move was inspired by a number of factors. By that time, the United Kingdom was operating a very successful gold standard in relation to the gold sovereign that had been introduced in 1816, and there was a desire to extend this system to the colonies. In addition to this, the supply of Spanish dollars ("pieces of eight") had been cut off as a result of the revolutions in Latin America, where most of the Spanish dollars were minted. The last Spanish Dollar was in fact minted at Potosi, Jamaica in 1825. There was also a growing desire to have a stable and steady supply of British shillings throughout the British Empire.

The 1825 order-in-council was largely a failure because it made sterling silver coinage legal tender at the unrealistic rate in relation to the Spanish dollar of $1 = 4 shillings and 4 pence. In 1838, remedial legislation was introduced for the British West Indies, with a new and more realistic rate of $1 = 4s 2d. As a result, most of the British West Indies used sterling coinage from around 1840 until 1955. On the outbreak of the Second World War, the sterling area was created as a wartime emergency measure in order to protect the external value of sterling. All of the British West Indies territories joined the sterling area in 1939, even including British Honduras, which might conceivably have followed the path of Canada and Newfoundland and remained outside the arrangement.

Despite the use of sterling coinage throughout the British West Indies during this period, there was also a mixed usage of sterling accounts and dollar accounts, and there was an eventual move towards dollar accounts in all the territories in conjunction with decimal fractional coinage. This article will chart the circumstances and changes in the individual territories.

== British Honduras ==
British Honduras, renamed Belize in 1973, was the first British colony in the Caribbean area to replace sterling currency with a US dollar-based currency. That occurred in 1885 as a result of the fact that the dollar of neighbouring Guatemala had driven the sterling coinage out of circulation. The authorities wanted to return to the gold standard, and the choice of the US dollar was influenced by growing trade links with New Orleans in the USA. (See the main article entitled the Belize dollar.)

== British Guiana ==
British Guiana, renamed Guyana on independence in 1966, was the only one of the territories in the British West Indies to use dollar accounts in both the public and private sectors throughout the period 1839 to 1950. Although sterling coinage circulated during this period, it did so in conjunction with the Spanish dollar unit of account at the fixed rate of $1 = 4s 2d. Another feature of interest that was exclusive to British Guiana was the special issue four pence (4d) coin known as the groat. (See the main article at Guyanese dollar.)

== Bermuda ==
From 1842 until 1970, Bermuda used the sterling currency as the official currency in both specie coinage and also as the unit of account. (See the main article at Bermudian pound.)

== The Bahamas ==
Unlike Bermuda, the Bahamas, although using the sterling system, both in coinage and as a unit of account, also allowed the US dollar to unofficially circulate alongside the Pound sterling. (See the main article at Bahamian pound.)

== Jamaica ==
Jamaica used both sterling coinage and sterling units of account from 1840 until 1969. But unlike the rest of the British West Indies, Jamaica had its own special varieties of the sterling copper coinage. Apart from a Bahamas penny of 1806, and the four pence (4d) groat coins that were specially minted for the British West Indies, and later for British Guiana only, the rest of the British West Indies just used exactly the same coinage that was circulating in the United Kingdom. When Jamaica went decimal in 1969, the new Jamaican dollar was in effect a half-pound. Jamaica and the Cayman Islands were therefore the only territories in the British West Indies to continue with a descendent unit of the pound sterling. (See the main article at Jamaican pound.)

== The Cayman Islands ==
The Cayman Islands, being a dependency of Jamaica, followed a course similar to that of Jamaica. (See the main article at Jamaican pound.)

== The Turks and Caicos Islands ==
The Turks and Caicos Islands, being a dependency of Jamaica, followed a course similar to that of Jamaica. However, when Jamaica went unto the decimal system in 1969, the Turks and Caicos Islands took the opportunity of changing over to the US dollar.

== The Eastern Caribbean group ==
The Eastern Caribbean group comprised Trinidad and Tobago, Barbados, the Windward Islands, and the Leeward Islands. These territories all used sterling coinage in conjunction with a mixture of sterling accounts and Spanish dollar accounts. The private banking sector tended to use Spanish dollar accounts at the fixed exchange rate of $1 = 4s 2d. The Eastern Caribbean group formed a monetary union with British Guiana in 1949 and the currency was known as the British West Indies dollar. Trinidad and Tobago left the arrangement in 1964. A new arrangement came about the following year and the currency was renamed the Eastern Caribbean dollar. British Guiana withdrew from this monetary union in 1966 and Barbados withdrew in 1972. (See the main articles at British West Indies dollar, Eastern Caribbean dollar, Trinidad and Tobago dollar, Guyanese dollar, and Barbados dollar.)

== The British Virgin Islands ==
Although part of the Leeward Islands group in the Eastern Caribbean, the British Virgin Islands were somewhat problematic as regards currency, due to the close proximity to the Danish West Indies that were bought by the US in 1917 and became the US Virgin Islands. Sterling was the official currency but there was always a large circulation of Danish krone and later US dollars. When the British West Indies dollar was introduced to the British Virgin Islands in 1951 there were protests, and in 1961 the British Virgin Islands formally adopted the US dollar as its official currency. (See Eastern Caribbean dollar.)

== See also ==
- Sterling area
- List of British currencies
- International status and usage of the euro
- Central banks and currencies of the Caribbean
- Commonwealth banknote-issuing institutions
- List of Commonwealth of Nations countries by GDP
- List of stock exchanges in the United Kingdom, the British Crown Dependencies and United Kingdom Overseas Territories
