= List of British currencies =

A variety of currencies are tender in the United Kingdom, its overseas territories and crown dependencies. This list covers all of those currently in circulation.

Location	Native currency	Issuing authority
England; Wales; British Antarctic Territory; Tristan da Cunha; South Georgia and the South Sandwich Islands	Sterling	Bank of England
Scotland	Local, privately-issued sterling banknotes	Issued by license of the Bank of England to Scotland's three largest clearing banks (the Royal Bank of Scotland, the Bank of Scotland and the Clydesdale Bank)
Northern Ireland	Local, privately-issued sterling banknotes	Issued under a licence of the Bank of England to four retail banks : Bank of Ireland, First Trust Bank, Danske Bank (formerly Northern Bank) and Ulster Bank.
Jersey	Jersey pound (local, government-issued sterling banknotes and coins)	Issued by license of the Bank of England to the Treasury and Resources Department, States of Jersey
Guernsey (including Alderney, Sark and Herm)	Guernsey pound (local, government-issued sterling banknotes and coins); Alderney pound (local, government-issued commemorative coins)	Issued by license of the Bank of England to the Treasury and Resources Department, States of Guernsey
Isle of Man	Manx pound (local, government-issued sterling banknotes and coins)	Issued by license of the Bank of England to the Isle of Man Treasury
Falkland Islands	Falkland Islands pound (parity with pound sterling)	Government of the Falkland Islands
Gibraltar	Gibraltar pound (parity with pound sterling) Euro accepted unofficially in most establishments	Government of Gibraltar
Saint Helena; Ascension Island	Saint Helenian pound (parity with pound sterling) (US$ accepted in Ascension Island)	Government of Saint Helena
British Indian Ocean Territory	United States dollar (de facto) Sterling (de jure)	US Federal Reserve System
British Virgin Islands; Turks and Caicos Islands	United States dollar Bahamian dollar also accepted in the Turks and Caicos Islands	US Federal Reserve System
Anguilla; Montserrat	Eastern Caribbean dollar (2.7EC$=1US$)	Eastern Caribbean Central Bank
Bermuda	Bermudian dollar (parity with United States dollar)	Bermuda Monetary Authority
Cayman Islands	Cayman Islands dollar (1KY$=1.2US$)	Cayman Islands Monetary Authority
Pitcairn Islands	New Zealand dollar US dollar widely accepted Pound sterling is also accepted. Pitcairn Islands dollar (on par with New Zealand dollar; commemorative issue only)	Reserve Bank of New Zealand
Akrotiri and Dhekelia	Euro	European Central Bank

== See also ==
- Sterling area
- Bank of England
- Currencies of the British West Indies
- International status and usage of the euro
- Commonwealth banknote-issuing institutions
- List of countries by leading trade partners
- List of stock exchanges in the United Kingdom, the British Crown Dependencies and United Kingdom Overseas Territories
