= Saint Kitts dollar =

The history of currency in the British colony of St. Kitts closely follows that of the British Eastern Caribbean territories in general. Even though Queen Anne's proclamation of 1704 brought the gold standard to the West Indies, silver pieces of eight (Spanish dollars and later Mexican dollars) continued to form a major portion of the circulating currency right into the latter half of the nineteenth century.

Britain adopted the gold standard in 1821 and an imperial order-in-council of 1838 resulted in St. Kitts formally adopting the sterling currency in the year 1849 (and Nevis in 1858). However, despite the circulation of British coins in St. Kitts, the silver pieces of eight continued to circulate alongside them and the private sector continued to use dollar accounts for reckoning. The international silver crisis of 1873 signalled the end of the silver dollar era in the West Indies and silver dollars were demonetized in St. Kitts in the wake of that crisis. This left a state of affairs, in which the British coinage circulated, being reckoned in dollar accounts at an automatic conversion rate of 1 dollar = 4 shillings 2 pence.

From 1949, with the introduction of the British West Indies dollar, the currency of St. Kitts became officially tied up with that of the British Eastern Caribbean territories in general. The British sterling coinage was eventually replaced by a new decimal coinage in 1955, with the new cent being equal to one half of the old penny.

== Early history ==
The currency comprises various cut Spanish dollars and overstamped French colonial coins. The dollar was subdivided into 12 bits (each worth 9 pence). In 1801, four types of coins were issued. Coins for 1 1/2 pence, known as black dogs, were produced by countermarking French colonial 24 deniers coins with the letter "S". The other coins were 1/8, 1/4 and 1/2 dollar pieces, produced by cutting Spanish or Spanish colonial 8 reales (Spanish dollars) and countermarking them with an "S". A second issue between 1809 and 1812 was of coins for 2 1/4 pence (1/4 black dog) produced by countermarking French Guianan 2 sous coins with the letter "S.K.". In 1830, sterling was established as the official currency of the island.

In 1913, the first private banknotes were issued, denominated in dollars. From 1920, some of these notes were also denominated in sterling, with 1 dollar = 4 shillings 2 pence. In 1935, the British West Indies dollar was introduced, equal in value to the Saint Kitts dollar and other dollars circulating in the British West Indies. Private banks continued to issue notes until 1938. The British West Indies dollar was replaced in 1965 by the East Caribbean dollar.

=== Banknotes ===
The Royal Bank of Canada introduced 5 dollar notes in 1913, continuing to issue them until 1938. The Colonial Bank issued 5 dollars notes until 1926, after which Barclays Bank (which had taken over the Colonial Bank) began issuing 5 dollars notes and continued until 1937.

- 1938 RBC Saint Kitts banknote (obverse)
- 1938 RBC Saint Kitts banknote (reverse)
