= Saint Vincent dollar =

The history of currency in the British colony of Saint Vincent closely follows that of the British Eastern Caribbean territories in general. As such, it should not be considered in isolation. In order to get a broad overview of currency in the region, see the article British West Indies dollar.

Even though Queen Anne's proclamation of 1704 brought the gold standard to the West Indies, silver pieces of eight (Spanish dollars and later Mexican dollars) continued to form a major portion of the circulating currency right into the latter half of the nineteenth century. Britain adopted the gold standard in 1821 and an imperial order-in-council of 1838 resulted in British sterling coinage being introduced to St. Vincent in the year 1839. However, despite the circulation of British coins in St. Vincent, the silver pieces of eight continued to circulate alongside them and the private sector continued to use dollar accounts for reckoning. The international silver crisis of 1873 signalled the end of the silver dollar era in the West Indies and silver dollars were demonetized in St. Vincent in 1879 for fear that the silver standard might return. Even though the British sterling coins were made of silver, they were fractional coins of the British gold sovereign and hence they maintained their gold value. This left a state of affairs, in which the British coinage circulated, being reckoned in dollar accounts at an automatic conversion rate of 1 dollar = 4 shillings 2 pence.

From 1949, with the introduction of the British West Indies dollar, the currency of St. Vincent became officially tied up with that of the British Eastern Caribbean territories in general. The British sterling coinage was eventually replaced by a new decimal coinage in 1955, with the new cent being equal to one half of the old penny.

== Early history ==
In 1797, coins were produced for 1 black dog, 1 stampee and ¼ and ½ dollar. The black dog and stampee were made by counterstamping an "SV" monogram on French colonial coins, whilst the ¼ and ½ dollar were made by cutting 8 reales coins (Spanish dollars) into four or two and stamping them with the "SV" monogram.

Between 1811 and 1814 currency consisted of various counterstamped Spanish and Spanish colonial coins, some of which were cut or holed. The Spanish dollar was subdivided into bits, each worth 9 pence, 6 black dogs or 4 stampees. Before 1811, 1 dollar = 11 bits and the dollar equalled 8 Spanish reales. After 1811, 1 dollar = 12 bits and 1½ dollars equalled 8 reales. 4½, 6, 9 and 12 bits coins were produced. The 4½ and 9 bits were made from 2 and 4 reales coins. The 4½ bits was counterstamped with "S", "IV½" and "B", whilst the 9 bits was counterstamped with "S" and "IX". To produce the 6 and 12 bits, 8 reales coins were holed. The central plug was stamped with "S" and "VI" to produce the 6 bits, whilst the ring (or holey dollar) was stamped with "S" and "XII" to make the 12 bits.

The revolutions in Spanish America cut off the supply of the Spanish Dollars at a time when Britain had recently introduced a successful gold standard. As such, it became expedient to introduce British sterling coinage to all the colonies. Sterling coinage was introduced following an imperial order-in-council of 1825 which set ratings for sterling in relation to the Spanish dollar and some other major coinages which were in circulation at the time.

== Paper Money ==
In 1882, the first private banknotes were issued, denominated in dollars. It was pegged to sterling with 1 dollar = 4 shillings 2 pence. In 1935, the British West Indies dollar was introduced, equal in value to all other dollars circulating in the British West Indies. Private banks continued to issue notes until 1941. The British West Indies dollar was replaced in 1965 by the East Caribbean dollar.

=== Banknotes ===
The Colonial Bank issued 5 dollars notes in 1882. Barclays Bank (which had taken over the Colonial Bank) issued 5 dollars notes between 1926 and 1941.
