= South Point Lighthouse =

Lighthouse in Barbados

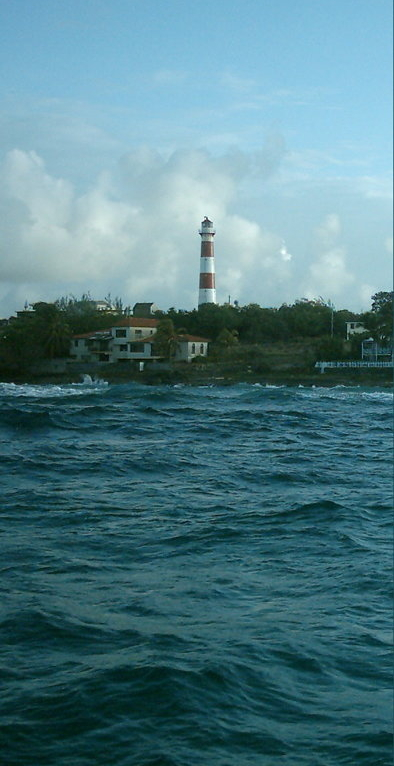
- South Point Lighthouse in 2007.
- Location: South Point, Barbados
- Coordinates: 13.047174°N 59.529368°W

Tower
- Constructed: 1852
- Construction: cast iron tower
- Height: 27 metres (89 ft)
- Shape: cylindrical tower with balcony and lantern
- Markings: white and red horizontal bands

Light
- Focal height: 44 metres (144 ft)
- Range: 17 nmi (31 km; 20 mi)
- Characteristic: FI (3) W 30s.

South Point Lighthouse is a lighthouse located in the south of Barbados. Its height is 89 feet (27 m).

== History ==
It is the oldest lighthouse in Barbados. It was brought to Barbados in 1852, one year after being shown at London's Great Exhibition, and reassembled on the southernmost point of the island. Although still listed as active, the lighthouse is now considered to be more of a national landmark and tourist attraction, with its grounds (but not tower) being made open to the public. The lighthouse has been depicted on the reverse of the 5 cent coin of the Barbadian coinage since 1973.

== See also ==
- List of lighthouses in Barbados
