= Barbadian dollar =

Currency of Barbados

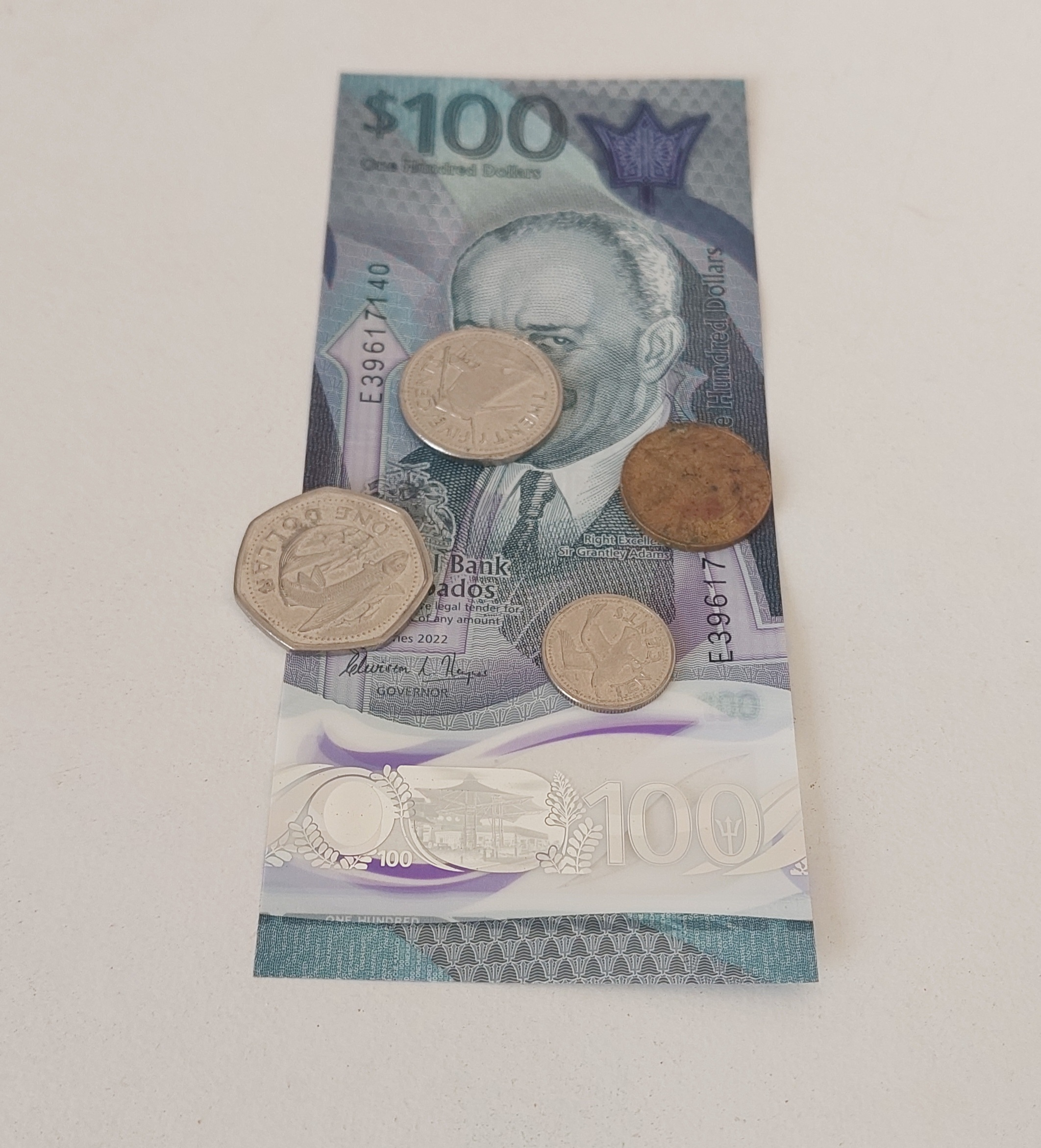
- A Series 2022 Barbadian 100 dollar bill and a selection of coins, ranging from $1 to 5¢

ISO 4217
- Code: BBD (numeric: 052)
- Subunit: 0.01

Unit
- Symbol: $, BB$, BBD$, BDS$

Denominations
- Banknotes: $2, $5, $10, $20, $50, $100
- Coins
- Freq. used: 1¢, 5¢, 10¢, 25¢, $1

Demographics
- User(s): Barbados

Issuance
- Central bank: Central Bank of Barbados
- Website: www.centralbank.org.bb

Valuation
- Inflation: 2.2%
- Source: Central Bank of Barbados, January 2022.
- Pegged with: US$1=BBD$2

The Barbadian dollar (sign: $; code: BBD) is the official currency in Barbados. It is often abbreviated to international unofficial abbreviations in Barbados such as: B$, BD$ or the International vehicle registration code BDS$ is also commonly used, (Note: The alphabetic code is based on another ISO standard, ISO 3166, which lists the codes for country names. The first two letters of the ISO 4217 three-letter code are the same as the code for the country name, and, where possible, the third letter corresponds to the first letter of the currency name. For example: The US dollar is represented as USD – the US coming from the ISO 3166 country code and the D for dollar. The Swiss franc is represented by CHF – the CH being the code for Switzerland in the ISO 3166 code and F for franc.) (Note: The Government of Barbados and the Central Bank often use the International vehicle registration code "BDS" instead of the ISO 4217 code "BBD". For example, the Central Bank uses the code "BDS$" for listing past exchange rates on its website.) a currency code that is otherwise reserved for Bangladesh (ISO 3166-1 country code BD) outside Barbados. As such the present Barbados dollar has the official ISO 4217 code of BB which matches the [dot] .bb Cc-TLD domain names classification for Barbados under ISO 3166, plus D for dollar in the foreign exchange market. The Barbadian dollar can be divided into 100 cents, though the 1 cent coin is in the process of being phased out.

== History ==
The history of currency in the former British colony of Barbados closely follows that of British Eastern Caribbean territories in general. Even though Queen Anne's proclamation of 1704 introduced the pound sterling currency system to the West Indies, silver pieces of eight (Spanish dollars and later Mexican dollars) continued to form a major portion of the circulating currency right into the latter half of the nineteenth century.

Britain adopted the gold standard in 1821 and an imperial order-in-council of 1838 resulted in Barbados formally adopting the British sterling coinage in the year 1848. However, despite the circulation of British coins in Barbados the silver pieces of eight continued to circulate alongside them and the private sector continued to use dollar accounts for reckoning. The international silver crisis of 1873 signalled the end of the silver dollar era in the West Indies and silver dollars were demonetized in Barbados in 1879. This left a state of affairs, in which the British coinage circulated, being reckoned in dollar accounts at an automatic conversion rate of 1 dollar = 4 shillings 2 pence. The first currency denominated in dollars to be issued in Barbados was in the form of private banknotes introduced in 1882. No subdivisions of the dollar were issued and these notes circulated alongside sterling, together with 1 pound notes issued by the government in 1917. From 1920, some of the private banknotes also carried a denomination in sterling, with 1 dollar = 4 shillings 2 pence.

From 1949, with the introduction of the British West Indies dollar, the currency of Barbados became officially tied with those of the British Eastern Caribbean territories in general. Between 1938 and 1949, the Barbadian government issued paper money denominated in dollars. The last private bank issues were made in 1949. The British sterling coinage was eventually replaced by a new decimal coinage in 1955, with the new cent being equal to one half of the old penny. In 1965, the Eastern Caribbean dollar replaced the British West Indies dollar in Barbados.

The present dollar was created after the establishment of the Central Bank of Barbados (CBB), which was founded by an Act of parliament in May, 1972. The Barbados dollar replaced the East Caribbean dollar at par in 1973. Since 5 July 1975, the Barbados dollar has been pegged to the US dollar. It is presently fixed at an exchange rate of US$1 = BBD$1.98. However, in practice in businesses, the effective exchange rate with US dollar is fixed at 2 to 1 in favor of the US dollar, i.e. US$1=BBD$2

For a wider outline of the history of currency in the region, see Currencies of the British West Indies.

== Coins ==
In 1973, the first year of Barbados having its own coinage, coins were introduced in denominations of 1¢, 5¢, 10¢, 25¢, and $1. From 1973 through 1991, the 1¢ was struck in bronze. From 1992, copper-plated zinc has been used. The 5¢ coin is struck in brass, whilst the highest 3 denominations are struck in cupronickel. The $1 coin is a 7-sided equilaterally-curved piece. A flying fish is adorned on one side, with the Barbadian coat of arms on the reverse. The Barbadian dollar coins are now minted in a plated-steel planchet first issued in 2007. Many of the coins in circulation have been struck at the Royal Canadian Mint.

The reverse of the 5 cent coin depicts the South Point Lighthouse, the oldest lighthouse in Barbados.

Coins of the Barbadian dollar
Image	Value	Technical parameters				Description			Date of first minting
Image	Value	Diameter	Thickness	Mass	Composition	Edge	Obverse	Reverse	Date of first minting
	1 cent	18.86 mm	1.55 mm	2.78 g	Copper-plated steel	Plain	Coat of arms of Barbados	Trident	2007
	5 cents	21.2 mm	1.65 mm	3.45 g	Brass-plated steel	Plain	Coat of arms of Barbados	South Point Lighthouse	2007
	10 cents	17.77 mm	1.35 mm	2.09 g	Nickel-plated steel	Reeded	Coat of arms of Barbados	Laughing Gull	2007
	25 cents	23.66 mm	1.82 mm	5.1 g	Nickel-plated steel	Reeded	Coat of arms of Barbados	Morgan Lewis Windmill	2007
	1 dollar	25.85 mm	1.65 mm	5.95 g	Nickel-plated steel	Plain	Coat of arms of Barbados	Flying fish	2007

== Banknotes ==
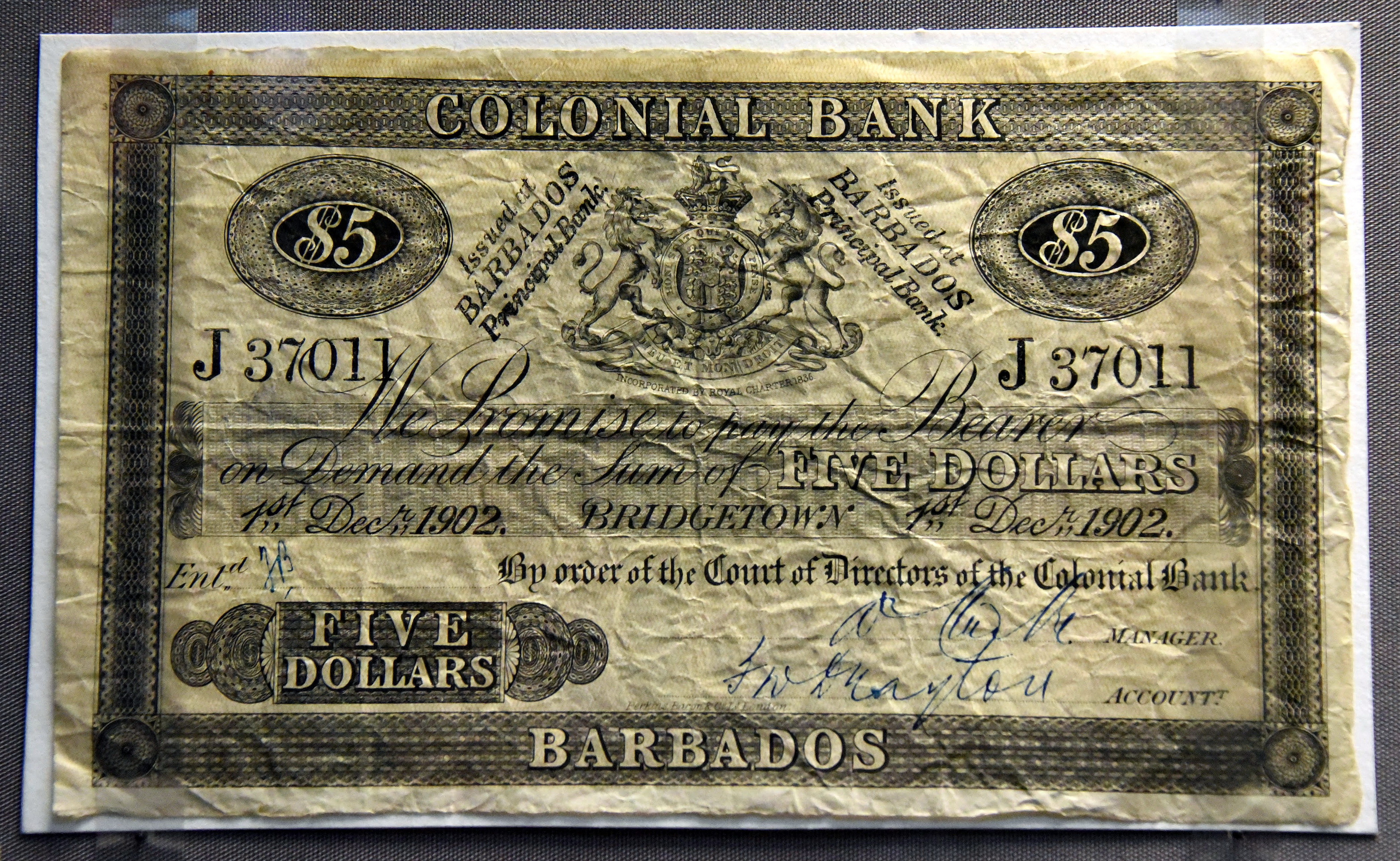
5 dollar note, Colonial Bank, Barbados, 1902. On display at the British Museum in London

In 1882, the Colonial Bank introduced notes for 5 dollars. In 1920, 20 and 100 dollar notes were also issued by this bank. In 1922, Barclays Bank, having taken over the Colonial Bank, began issuing 5, 20 and 100 dollar notes. The higher denominations ceased production in 1940 but the 5 dollar continued to be issued until 1949.

The Royal Bank of Canada introduced notes in 1909, in denominations of 5, 20 and 100 dollars. From 1920, these notes also bore the denomination in sterling, with 5 dollars = 1 pound 10 pence, 20 dollars = 4 pounds 3 shillings 4 pence and 100 dollars = 20 pounds 16 shillings 8 pence. Notes were issued until 1938. The Canadian Bank of Commerce issued notes between 1922 and 1940, also in denominations of 5, 20 and 100 dollars.

Between 1938 and 1949, the government issued notes in denominations of 1, 2, 5, 20 and 100 dollars. All bore the portrait of King George VI.

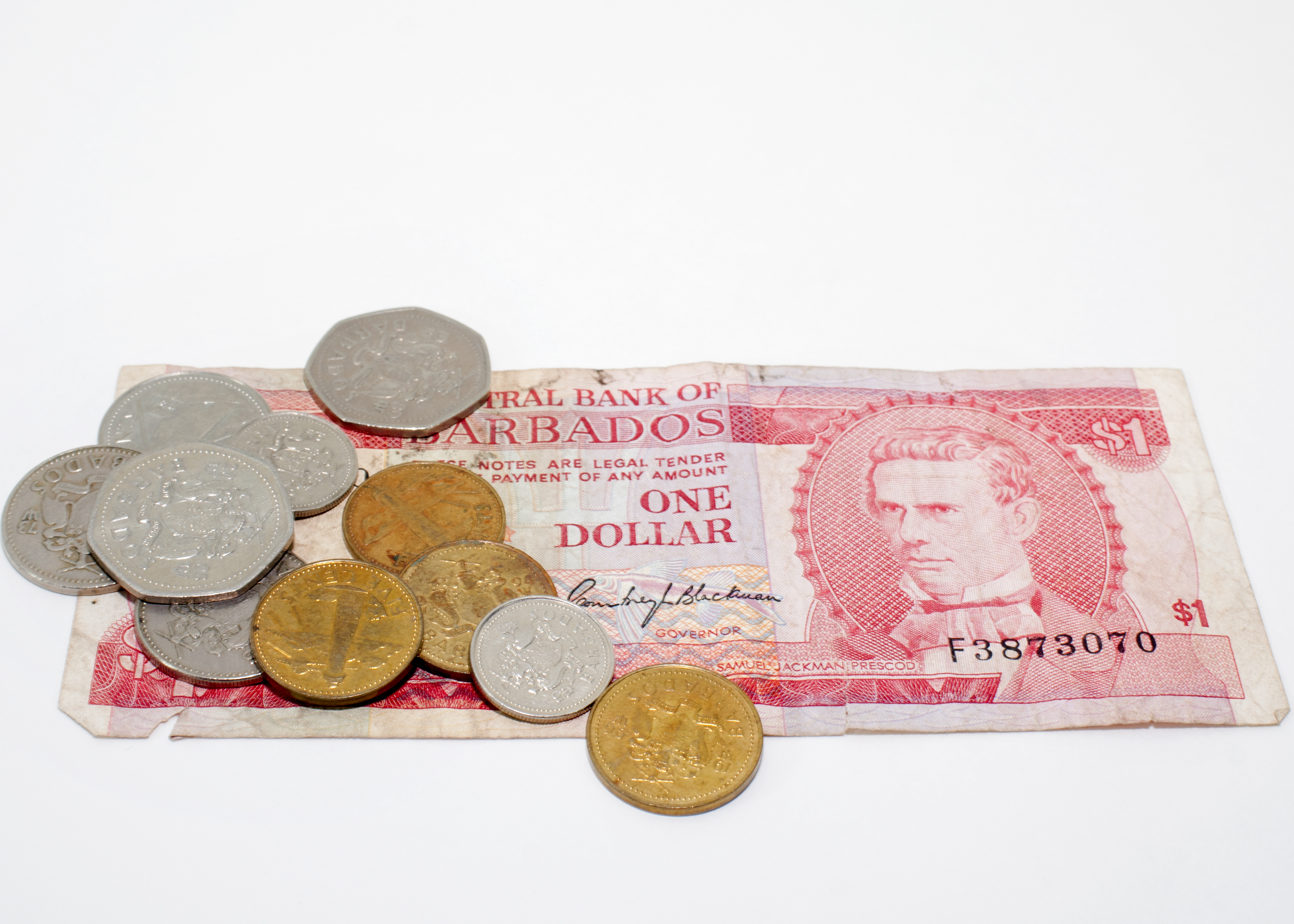
A selection of coins of the Barbadian dollar, plus a $1 note.

On 3 December 1973, the Central Bank of Barbados introduced notes in denominations of 1, 5, 10, 20 and 100 dollars. 2 dollar notes were introduced in 1980, followed by 50 dollars in 1989. The 1 dollar note was no longer issued after 1988.

Banknotes currently in circulation are:

- 2 dollars (blue)
- 5 dollars (green)
- 10 dollars (brown)
- 20 dollars (purple)
- 50 dollars (orange)
- 100 dollars (grey)

The defunct 1 Dollar note was red in colour and had Samuel Jackman Prescod on the obverse.

On 2 May 2013, the Central Bank of Barbados issued a new series of banknotes with a more modern design. The portraits on all of the denominations have been retained, but on the back of the notes is a design specific to the person depicted on the front of the notes.

On 21 March 2022, the Central Bank of Barbados announced its intent to replace the current paper banknotes with polymer banknotes by the end of the year stating it would allow for more secure and durable cash. The new designs of the polymer banknotes were then later revealed on 4 May 2022 and the notes were rolled out on 5 December 2022, and will circulate alongside existing paper banknotes for the foreseeable future.

Current BBD exchange rates
From Google Finance:	AUD CAD CHF CNY EUR GBP HKD JPY USD EUR JPY USD
From Yahoo! Finance:	AUD CAD CHF CNY EUR GBP HKD JPY USD EUR JPY USD
From XE.com:	AUD CAD CHF CNY EUR GBP HKD JPY USD EUR JPY USD
From OANDA:	AUD CAD CHF CNY EUR GBP HKD JPY USD EUR JPY USD

== See also ==
- ISO 3166-2:BB
- List of people on banknotes § Barbados
- Currencies of the British West Indies
- Central banks and currencies of the Caribbean
- Economy of Barbados
