= Morgan Lewis Sugar Mill =

Windmill in Barbados

Coordinates: 13°16′06″N 59°34′30″W

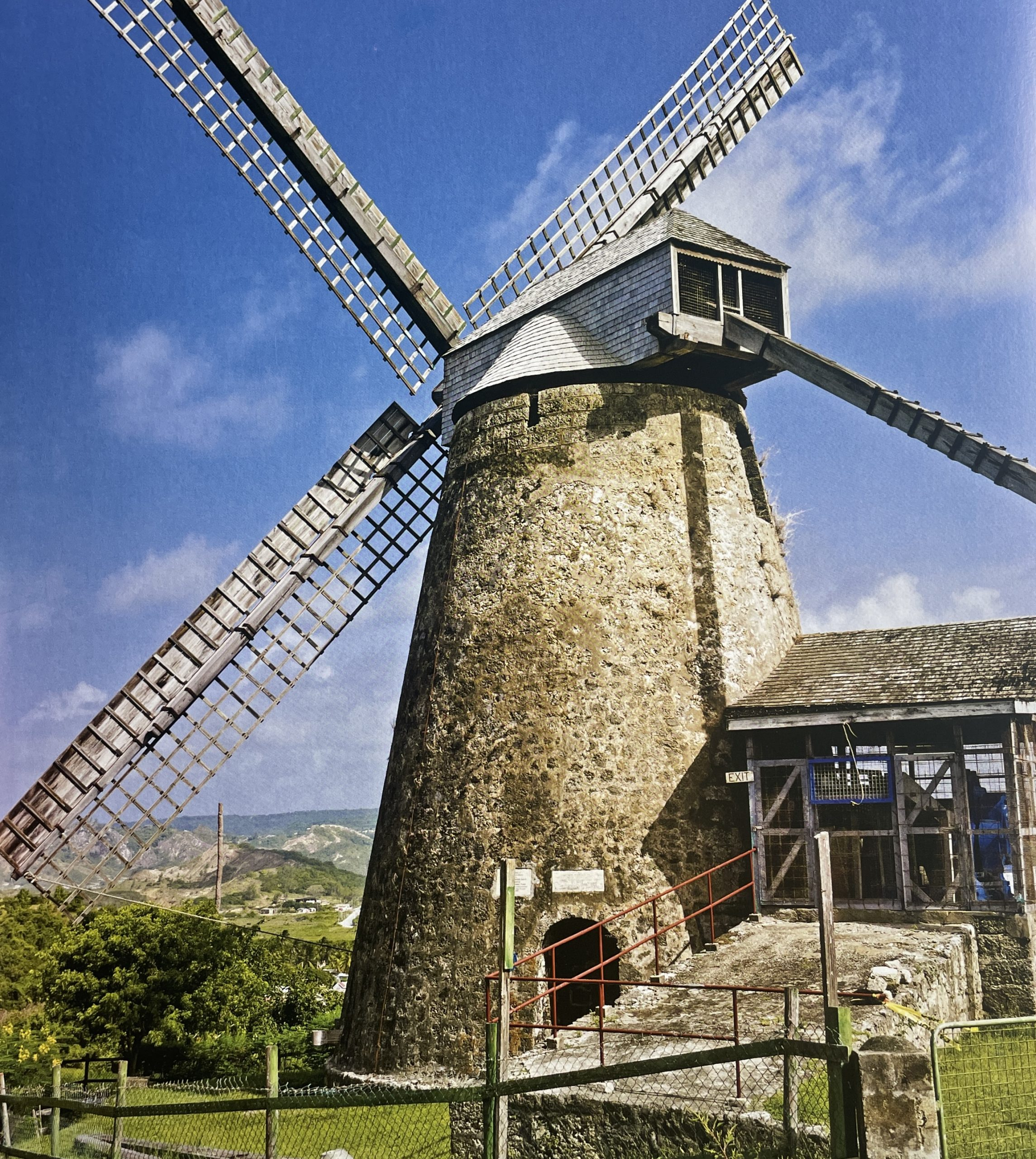
Morgan Lewis Sugar Mill.

Morgan Lewis Sugar Mill is a sugar windmill in St. Andrew, Barbados. It is the biggest and only surviving complete version in the Caribbean. The mill stopped operating in 1947. In 1962, it was donated to the Barbados National Trust by its owner Egbert L. Bannister for preservation as a museum.

The site was listed in the 1996 World Monuments Watch by the World Monuments Fund. Restoration began by the Barbados National Trust during the following summer. In 1997, financial support was provided by American Express for emergency repairs. The mill was dismantled for restoration, and reopened in 1999. With all its original working parts having been preserved intact, the sails were able to turn again after the project was completed, and cane was ground again after more than half a century.

During the 'crop' season, February through July, its sails are put in place and it operated one Sunday in each month, grinding cane and providing cane juice. Around the interior of the mill wall is a museum of sugar mill and plantation artifacts, and an exhibition of old photographs. Visitors can climb to the top of the mill.

Since 2013, the Morgan Lewis Sugar Mill has been featured on the reverse of the Barbadian $2 bill.
