= Eastern Caribbean dollar =

Currency of the Organisation of Eastern Caribbean States

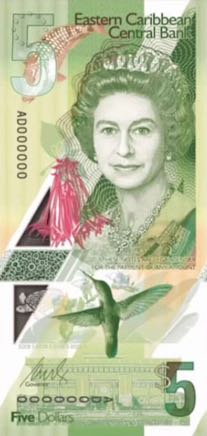

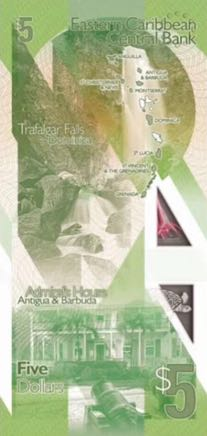

ISO 4217
- Code: XCD (numeric: 951)
- Subunit: 0.01

Units of account
- Base unit: dollar
- Plural: dollars
- Symbol: $
- Subunit
- 1/100: cent
- Plural
- cent: cents

Denominations
- Banknotes: EC$2, EC$5, EC$10, EC$20, EC$50, EC$100
- Coins: 5, 10, 25 cents, EC$1

Demographics
- Date of introduction: 1965
- User(s): List of users: Anguilla; Antigua and Barbuda; Dominica; Grenada; Montserrat; Saint Kitts and Nevis; Saint Lucia; Saint Vincent and the Grenadines

Issuance
- Central bank: Eastern Caribbean Central Bank
- Website: www.eccb-centralbank.org

Valuation
- Pegged with: U.S. dollar = XCD 2.70

The Eastern Caribbean dollar (symbol: $ or EC$; code: XCD) is the currency of all seven full members and one associate member of the Organisation of Eastern Caribbean States (OECS). The successor to the British West Indies dollar, it has been issued since 1965.

Its base unit is the dollar, and each dollar is subdivided into 100 cents. It has been pegged to the United States dollar since 7 July 1976, at the exchange rate of US$1 = EC$2.70.

== Circulation ==
Six of the states using the EC$ are independent states: Antigua and Barbuda, Dominica, Grenada, Saint Kitts and Nevis, Saint Lucia, and Saint Vincent and the Grenadines. The other two, Anguilla and Montserrat, are British Overseas Territories. These states are all members of the Eastern Caribbean Currency Union.

Other associate members of the OECS do not use the Eastern Caribbean dollar as their official currency: the British Virgin Islands, Guadeloupe and Martinique. The British Virgin Islands were always problematic for currency purposes due to their proximity to the Danish West Indies, which became the United States Virgin Islands in 1917. Officially, the British Virgin Islands used to use sterling, but in practice the situation was more complicated and involved the circulation of French francs and U.S. dollars. In 1951, the British Virgin Islands adopted the British West Indies dollar which at that time operated in conjunction with the sterling coinage, and in 1959 they changed over officially to the U.S. dollar.

Guadeloupe and Martinique, as part of France, use the euro as their currency.

British Guiana and Barbados had previously been members of the Eastern Caribbean Currency Union but withdrew in 1966 and 1972, respectively. Trinidad and Tobago had been a member of the earlier British West Indies currency union, but withdrew in 1964.

The combined population of the EC$ area is about 613,000 (2014 census and estimates) and the combined GDP is 5.46 billion US dollars.

The late Queen Elizabeth II appears on the banknotes and also on the obverse of the coins. She was the head of state of all the states and territories using the EC$, except for Dominica (which was granted independence from the United Kingdom as a republic). Dominica is nevertheless a member of the Commonwealth of Nations which now recognizes King Charles III as Head of the Commonwealth.

== History ==
Queen Anne's proclamation of 1704 was the first attempt to introduce sterling currency to the British West Indies, however it failed to displace the existing Spanish dollar currency system right up until the late 1870s. In 1822, the British government coined 1/4, 1/8, and 1/16 fractional 'Anchor dollars' for use in Mauritius and the British West Indies (but not Jamaica). A few years later copper fractional dollars were coined for Mauritius, Sierra Leone, and the British West Indies.

The next attempts to introduce British sterling silver coinage to the colonies came with an imperial order-in-council dated 1825. This move was inspired by a number of factors. The United Kingdom was now operating a very successful gold standard in relation to the gold sovereign that was introduced in 1816, and there was a desire to extend this system to the colonies. In addition to this, the supply of Spanish dollars (pieces of eight) had been cut off as a result of the revolutions in Latin America where most of the Spanish dollars were minted. The last Spanish Dollar was in fact minted at Potosi in 1825. There was now a growing desire to have a stable and steady supply of British shillings everywhere the British drum was beating. The 1825 order-in-council was largely a failure because it made sterling silver coinage legal tender at the unrealistic rating in relation to the Spanish dollar of $1 = 4 shillings 4 pence. It succeeded in Jamaica, Bermuda, and British Honduras because the authorities in those territories set aside the official ratings and used the more realistic rating of $1 = 4 shillings. The reality of the rating between the dollar and the pound was based on the silver content of the Spanish pieces of eight as compared to the gold content of the British gold sovereign.

A second imperial order-in-council was passed in 1838 with the correct rating of $1 = 4 shillings 2 pence. In the years following the 1838 order-in-council, the British West Indies territories began to enact local legislation for the purposes of assimilating their monies of account with the British pound sterling. Gold discoveries in Australia in 1851 drove the silver dollar out of the West Indies, but it returned again with the great depreciation in the value of silver that followed with Germany's transition to the gold standard between 1871 and 1873. In the years immediately following 1873, there was a fear that the British West Indies might return to a silver standard. As such, legislation was passed in the individual territories to demonetize the silver dollars. Even though the British coinage was also silver, it represented fractions of the gold sovereign and so its value was based on a gold standard.

During this period, and into the nineteenth century, accounts could be kept in either dollars or sterling. Jamaica, Bermuda, and the Bahamas preferred to use sterling accounts whereas British Guiana used dollar accounts. British Guiana used dollar accounts for the purpose of assisting in the transition from the Dutch guilder system of currency to the British pound sterling system. In the Eastern Caribbean territories the private sector preferred to use dollar accounts whereas the government preferred to use sterling accounts. In some of the Eastern Caribbean territories, notes were issued by various private banks, denominated in dollars equivalent to 4 shillings 2 pence. See Antigua dollar, Barbadian dollar, Dominican dollar, Grenadian dollar, Guyanese dollar, Saint Kitts dollar, Saint Lucia dollar, Saint Vincent dollar and Trinidad and Tobago dollar.

In 1946, a West Indian Currency Conference saw Barbados, British Guiana, the Leeward Islands, Trinidad and Tobago and the Windward Islands agree to establish a unified decimal currency system based on a West Indian dollar to replace the current arrangement of having three different Boards of Commissioners of Currency (for Barbados (which also served the Leeward and Windward Islands), British Guiana and Trinidad & Tobago).

In 1949, the British government formalized the dollar system of accounts in British Guiana and the Eastern Caribbean territories by introducing the British West Indies dollar (BWI$) at the already existing conversion rate of $4.80 per pound sterling (or $1 = 4 shillings 2 pence). It was one of the many experimental political and economic ventures tested by the British government to form a uniform system within the British West Indies territories. The symbol "BWI$" was frequently used and the currency was known verbally as the "Beewee" (slang for British West Indies) dollar. Shortly thereafter in 1950, the British Caribbean Currency Board (BCCB) was set up in Trinidad with the sole right to issue notes and coins of the new unified currency and given the mandate of keeping full foreign exchange cover to ensure convertibility at $4.80 per pound sterling. In 1951, the British Virgin Islands joined the arrangement, but this led to discontent because that territory was more naturally drawn to the currency of the neighbouring U.S. Virgin Islands. In 1961, the British Virgin Islands withdrew from the arrangement and adopted the U.S. dollar.

Until 1955, the BWI$ existed only as banknotes in conjunction with sterling fractional coinage. Decimal coins replaced the sterling coins in 1955. These decimal coins were denominated in cents, with each cent worth one halfpenny in sterling.

In 1958, the West Indies Federation was established and the BWI$ was its currency. However, although Jamaica (including the Cayman Islands and the Turks and Caicos Islands) was part of the West Indies Federation, it retained the Jamaican pound, despite adopting the BWI$ as legal tender from 1954. Jamaica, the Cayman Islands, and the Turks and Caicos Islands were already long established users of the sterling accounts system of pounds, shillings, and pence.

In 1964 Jamaica ended the legal tender status of the BWI$ and Trinidad and Tobago withdrew from the currency union (adopting the Trinidad and Tobago dollar) forcing the movement of the headquarters of the BCCB to Barbados and soon the "BWI$" dollar lost its regional support.

In 1965, the British West Indies dollar of the now defunct West Indies Federation was replaced at par by the Eastern Caribbean dollar and the BCCB was replaced by the Eastern Caribbean Currency Authority or ECCA (established by the Eastern Caribbean Currency Agreement 1965). British Guiana withdrew from the currency union the following year. Grenada, which had used the Trinidad and Tobago dollar from 1964, rejoined the common currency arrangement in 1968. Barbados withdrew from the currency union in 1972, following which the ECCA headquarters were moved to St. Kitts.

Between 1965 and 1983, the Eastern Caribbean Currency Authority issued the EC$, with banknotes from 1965 and coins from 1981. The EC$ is now issued by the Eastern Caribbean Central Bank, based in the city of Basseterre, in Saint Kitts and Nevis. The bank was established by an agreement (the Eastern Caribbean Central Bank Agreement) signed at Port of Spain on 5 July 1983.

The exchange rate of $4.80 = £1 sterling (equivalent to the old $1 = 4s 2d) continued until 1976 for the new Eastern Caribbean dollar.

For a wider outline of the history of currency in the region see Currencies of the British West Indies.

== Coins ==
Until 1981, the coins of the BWI$ circulated. In 1982, a new series of coins was introduced in denominations of 1, 2, 5, 10 and 25 cents and 1 dollar. The 1 and 5 cent coins were scalloped in shape while the 2 cent coin was square. These three were struck in aluminum. The 10 and 25 cent coins were round and cupro-nickel. The dollar was aluminum bronze and also round. The round, aluminum bronze dollar coin was replaced in 1989 with a decagonal, cupro-nickel type. In 2002 new and larger round-shaped 1, 2, and 5 cent pieces were introduced, along with a new 1 dollar coin which was also round. The effigy of Queen Elizabeth II was also changed that same year on all coin denominations to the Ian Rank-Broadley design, making it the last commonwealth currency up to that date to discontinue the Arnold Machin portrait. Their compositions remained aluminum and cupro-nickel, respectively. Higher denominations exist, but these were issued only as medal-coins. 1 and 2 cent coins were withdrawn from circulation in July 2015, and remained legal tender until 30 June 2020.

2002 Series
Value	Technical parameters			Description			Date of first minting
Value	Diameter	Mass	Composition	Edge	Obverse	Reverse	Date of first minting
1 cent	18.42 mm	1.03 g	Aluminium	Plain	Elizabeth II	Value, year of minting, "East Caribbean States", 2-branch wreath	2002
2 cents	21.46 mm	1.42 g	Aluminium	Plain	Elizabeth II	Value, year of minting, "East Caribbean States", 2-branch wreath	2002
5 cents	23.11 mm	1.74 g	Aluminium	Plain	Elizabeth II	Value, year of minting, "East Caribbean States", 2-branch wreath	2002
10 cents	18.06 mm	2.59 g	Cupronickel	Ribbed	Elizabeth II	Value, year of minting, "East Caribbean States", sailing ship	2002
25 cents	23.98 mm	6.48 g	Cupronickel	Ribbed	Elizabeth II	Value, year of minting, "East Caribbean States", sailing ship	2002
1 dollar	26.5 mm	7.98 g	Cupronickel	Alternate smooth and ribbed	Elizabeth II	Value, year of minting, "East Caribbean States", sailing ship	2002
For table standards, see the coin specification table.

== Banknotes ==
In 1965, the Eastern Caribbean Currency Authority issued banknotes in denominations of 1, 5, 20 and 100 dollars, all featuring Pietro Annigoni's 1956 portrait of Queen Elizabeth II in regalia of the Order of the Garter. The first issues in the name of the Eastern Caribbean Central Bank in 1985 were of the same denominations, with the addition of 10 dollar notes. The last 1 dollar notes were issued in 1989 and 50 dollar notes were introduced in 1993. On 1 April 2008, the Eastern Caribbean Central Bank issued a new series of banknotes which are like the preceding issues, except for omitting both the barcode and the country code letters which form part of the serial number on current notes. In 2012, the Eastern Caribbean Central Bank issued a series of banknotes with Braille features in an effort to provide notes which are easier for blind and visually impaired persons to use. The raised Braille characters on the upgraded notes feature a cricket theme in the form of balls and stumps. These characters have been added to the 10, 20, 50, and 100 dollar notes.

In 2019, the Eastern Caribbean Central Bank introduced a new family of notes produced in polymer substrate and presented in a vertical format.

2019 Issue
Obverse	Reverse	Denomination	Obverse	Reverse
East Caribbean States $5 note (front)	East Caribbean States $5 note (rear)	EC$5	Queen Elizabeth II, turtle, Green-throated carib	Trafalgar Falls, Dominica; Admiral's House, Antigua
East Caribbean States $10 note (front)	East Caribbean States $10 note (rear)	EC$10	Queen Elizabeth II, turtle, Green-throated carib	Admiralty Bay, Bequia, Saint Vincent and the Grenadines; Map of the Organisation of Eastern Caribbean States; brown pelican; tropical fish
East Caribbean States $20 note (front)	East Caribbean States $20 note (rear)	EC$20	Queen Elizabeth II, turtle, Green-throated carib	Government House, Montserrat, Nutmeg
East Caribbean States $50 note (front)	East Caribbean States $50 note (rear)	EC$50	Queen Elizabeth II, turtle, Green-throated carib	Sir K. Dwight Venner; Brimstone Hill Fortress National Park, St. Kitts; Map of the Organisation of Eastern Caribbean States, Tropical Fish
East Caribbean States $100 note (front)	East Caribbean States $100 note (rear)	EC$100	Queen Elizabeth II, turtle, Green-throated carib	Sir William Arthur Lewis, Map of the Organisation of Eastern Caribbean States, View of the twin peaks of Les Pitons Volcano – Petit Piton and Gros Piton near Soufrière in Saint Lucia, Tropical Fish

In 2023, a 2 dollar commemorative note was issued to celebrate the 40th anniversary of Eastern Caribbean Central Bank. It depicts on the observe a portrait of Sir Isaac Vivian ("The Master Blaster") wielding a cricket bat, a conch shell, and the Eastern Caribbean Central Bank building in Basseterre (St. Kitts). On the bottom is visible the anniversary logo and a coral reef scene. On the other side of the note (reverse) is shown a map of the Eastern Caribbean States and again the anniversary logo at top right; Fish, coral, and turtles at top left and bottom.

On 9 July 2026, the Eastern Caribbean Central Bank announced plans to introduce a new family of notes beginning in 2027. The new family retains the same denominations and color schemes as preceding issues, but with the portrait of Queen Elizabeth II on front replaced with new portraits to honor the people, heritage, and achievements of the eight member countries of the Eastern Caribbean Currency Union. Each participating member country was invited to nominate an individual whose life and legacy reflect the highest ideals of service, leadership, scholarship, and excellence.

2027 Issue
Obverse	Reverse	Denomination	Obverse	Reverse
		EC$5	Sir Kirani James and Robert Milton Cato	Trafalgar Falls, Dominica; Admiral's House, Antigua
		EC$10	William Henry Bramble and Ronald Webster	Admiralty Bay, Bequia, Saint Vincent and the Grenadines; Map of the Organisation of Eastern Caribbean States; brown pelican; tropical fish
		EC$20	Sir Vere Bird and Eugenia Charles	Government House, Montserrat, Nutmeg
		EC$50	Sir K. Dwight Venner and Sir Robert Llewellyn Bradshaw	Brimstone Hill fortress in St. Kitts
		EC$100	Sir William Arthur Lewis and Sir John Compton	Les Pitons Volcano in Saint Lucia

=== Previous issues ===
2008 Issue
Obverse	Reverse	Denomination	Obverse	Reverse
		EC$5	Queen Elizabeth II, turtle, Green-throated carib	Admiral's House in Antigua and Barbuda, Map of the Organisation of Eastern Caribbean States, silver compass rose, Trafalgar Falls in Dominica, tropical fish
		EC$10	Queen Elizabeth II, turtle, Green-throated carib	Admiralty Bay in St. Vincent & The Grenadines, Map of the Organisation of Eastern Caribbean States, silver compass rose, The Warspite schooner in Anguilla, brown pelican, tropical fish
		EC$20	Queen Elizabeth II, turtle, Green-throated carib	Government House Montserrat, Map of the Organisation of Eastern Caribbean States, silver compass rose, hands harvesting nutmeg in Grenada, tropical fish
		EC$50	Queen Elizabeth II, turtle, Green-throated carib	Brimstone Hill fortress in St. Kitts, Map of the Organisation of Eastern Caribbean States, silver compass rose, Les Pitons (volcanoes) in St. Lucia, sooty tern, tropical fish
		EC$100	Queen Elizabeth II, turtle, Green-throated carib	St. Lucian economist Sir William Arthur Lewis, map of the Organisation of Eastern Caribbean States, silver compass rose, Eastern Caribbean Central Bank building, Lesser Antillean swifts, tropical fish

The 2012 issue included raised braille elements for the visually-impaired in the form of a cricket ball and stumps. These were added to the EC$10, $20, $50, and $100 banknotes.

2012 Issue
Obverse	Reverse	Denomination	Obverse	Reverse
		EC$10	Queen Elizabeth II, turtle, Green-throated carib	Admiralty Bay in St. Vincent & The Grenadines, Map of the Organisation of Eastern Caribbean States, silver compass rose, The Warspite schooner in Anguilla, brown pelican, tropical fish
		EC$20	Queen Elizabeth II, turtle, Green-throated carib	Government House Montserrat, Map of the Organisation of Eastern Caribbean States, silver compass rose, hands harvesting nutmeg in Grenada, tropical fish
		EC$50	Queen Elizabeth II, turtle, Green-throated carib	Brimstone Hill fortress in St. Kitts, Map of the Organisation of Eastern Caribbean States, silver compass rose, Les Pitons (volcanoes) in St. Lucia, sooty tern, tropical fish
		EC$100	Queen Elizabeth II, turtle, Green-throated carib	St. Lucian economist Sir William Arthur Lewis, map of the Organisation of Eastern Caribbean States, silver compass rose, Eastern Caribbean Central Bank building, Lesser Antillean swifts, tropical fish

2015 Issue
Obverse	Reverse	Denomination	Obverse	Reverse
		EC$10	Queen Elizabeth II, turtle, Green-throated carib	Admiralty Bay in St. Vincent & The Grenadines, Map of the Organisation of Eastern Caribbean States, silver compass rose, The Warspite schooner in Anguilla, brown pelican, tropical fish
		EC$20	Queen Elizabeth II, turtle, Green-throated carib	Government House Montserrat, Map of the Organisation of Eastern Caribbean States, silver compass rose, hands harvesting nutmeg in Grenada, tropical fish
		EC$50	Queen Elizabeth II, turtle, Green-throated carib	Brimstone Hill fortress in St. Kitts, Map of the Organisation of Eastern Caribbean States, silver compass rose, Les Pitons (volcanoes) in St. Lucia, sooty tern, tropical fish
		EC$100	Queen Elizabeth II, turtle, Green-throated carib	St. Lucian economist Sir William Arthur Lewis, map of the Organisation of Eastern Caribbean States, silver compass rose, Eastern Caribbean Central Bank building, Lesser Antillean swifts, tropical fish

Current XCD exchange rates
From Google Finance:	AUD CAD CHF CNY EUR GBP HKD JPY USD EUR JPY
From Yahoo! Finance:	AUD CAD CHF CNY EUR GBP HKD JPY USD EUR JPY
From XE.com:	AUD CAD CHF CNY EUR GBP HKD JPY USD EUR JPY
From OANDA:	AUD CAD CHF CNY EUR GBP HKD JPY USD EUR JPY

== See also ==
- Amero
- CARICOM
- Central banks and currencies of the Caribbean
- Currencies of the British West Indies
- Currency union
- Eastern Caribbean Securities Exchange
- Economy of the Caribbean
- Sterling area
- SUCRE (currency)
