= Hannibal Head Holey Dollar =

Australian collectors coin

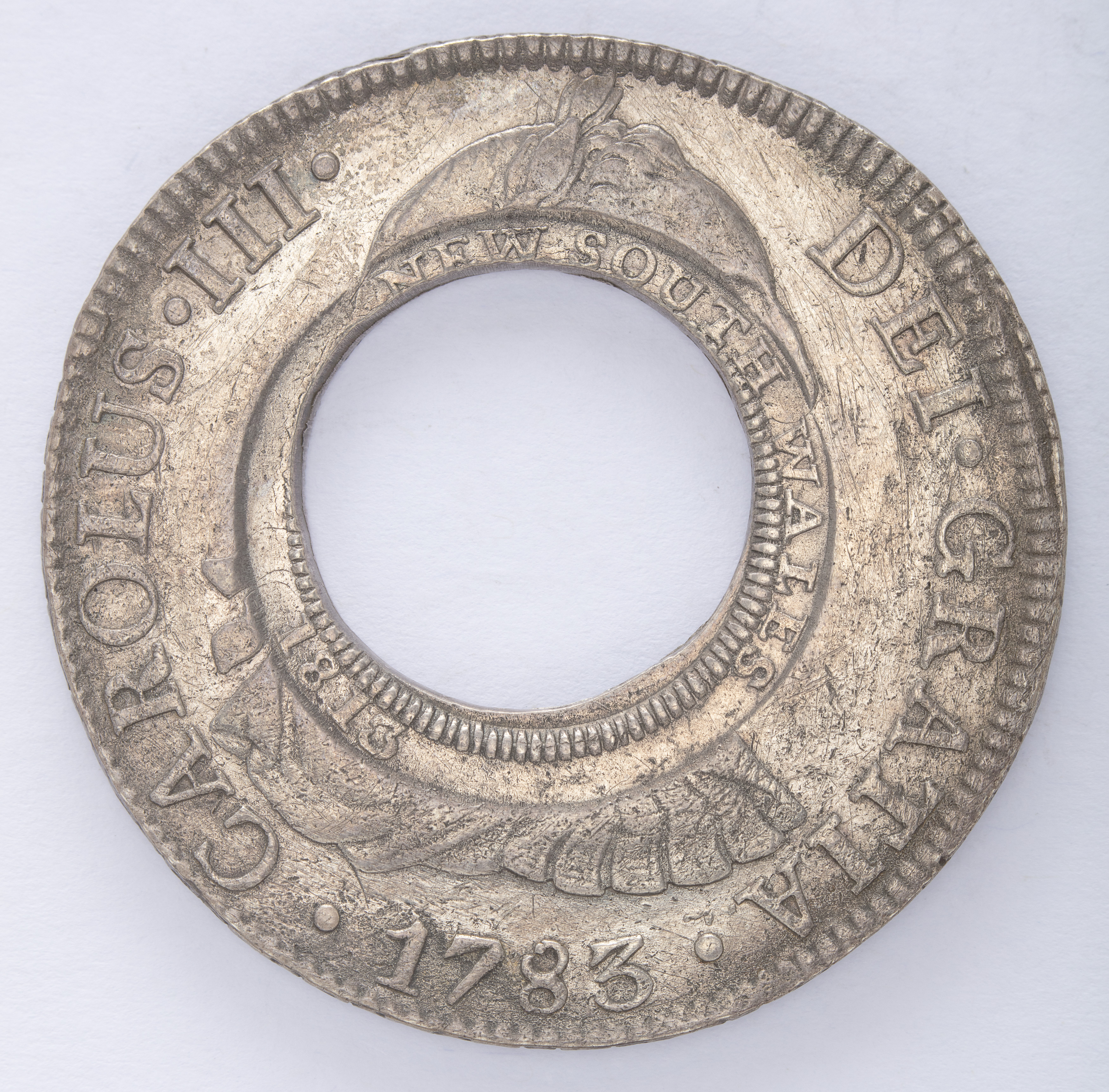
A New South Wales "Holey Dollar".

The Hannibal Head Holey Dollar is a one of a kind holey dollar coin made from a Spanish eight Reale coin that bore the image of Joseph Bonaparte. The coin was sold by Coinworks to a private collector in July 2018, fetching $500,000.

== History ==
The original Spanish eight reale coin that the Hannibal Head Holey was made from was struck in 1810 in Lima, Peru. At the time the monarch of Spain was King Joseph I of Spain, Napoleon Bonaparte’s elder brother. The Spanish people revolted against French rule in both Spain and its colonies and as a result a Peruvian mint created coins featuring an unflattering portrait of Joseph I. This gives the coin its name “Hannibal head.”

In 1812, much of the currency in New South Wales was being funneled out by trade with merchants which resulted in a shortage of coin. Governor Lachlan Macquarie wanted to fix this issue by creating a supply of coins for the colony that would be unusable outside of it. He shipped 40,000 Spanish silver 8 reale coins to New South Wales and began the process of transforming them into the Holey dollar. To do this Macquarie employed convicted forger William Henshall and gave him the task of stamping out the centers of each coin and counterstamping them so they would be useless outside of the colony. The outer ring was valued at five shillings while the central plug, known as the “Dump” was valued at fifteen pence. Around 300 of these coins are known to remain, most of which are in private collections.

In 1881 the Hannibal Head Holey dollar was found in Tasmania in what was believed to be a Bushrangers hoard. There is only one known holey dollar to bear the Hannibal Head portrait and is rated “nearly extremely fine” quality.

It went to auction in 2018 at the Eminent colonial auctions through Coinworks, valued at an estimated $450,000 and sold to a private collector for $500,000.
