= Antigua dollar =

Former currency of Antigua

Antigua and Barbuda are two separate islands which operate as one country. Along with many other countries of the Caribbean, they use the East Caribbean dollar as their official currency, which was first brought into circulation in 1965 to replace the British West Indies dollar.

Even though Queen Anne's proclamation of 1704 brought the gold standard to the West Indies, silver pieces of eight (Spanish dollars and later Mexican dollars) continued to form a major portion of the circulating currency right into the latter half of the nineteenth century.

Britain adopted the gold standard in 1821 and an imperial order-in-council of 1838 resulted in Antigua formally adopting the sterling currency on 13 January 1847. However, despite the circulation of British silver coins in Antigua, the silver pieces of eight continued to circulate alongside them, and the private sector continued to use dollar accounts for reckoning. The international silver crisis of 1873 signalled the end of the silver dollar era in the West Indies and silver dollars were demonetized in Antigua in the wake of this crisis for fear that a silver standard might return. Even though the British sterling coins were made of silver, they were fractional coins of the British gold sovereign and hence they maintained their gold value. This left a state of affairs, in which the British coinage circulated, being reckoned in dollar accounts at an automatic conversion rate of 1 dollar = 4 shillings 2 pence.

From 1949, with the introduction of the British West Indies dollar, the currency of Antigua became officially tied up with that of the British Eastern Caribbean territories in general. The British sterling coinage was eventually replaced by a new decimal coinage in 1955, with the new cent being equal to one half of the old penny.

The fixed exchange rate of $4.80 = £1 sterling (equivalent to the old $1 = 4s 2d) continued right up until 1976.

== Banknotes ==
Three banks, the Royal Bank of Canada, the Colonial Bank and Barclays Bank, all issued 5 dollars notes. The Royal Bank of Canada issued notes between 1913 and 1938, whilst the Colonial Bank issued notes in 1926 and Barclays Bank (which took over the Colonial Bank) issued notes between 1937 and 1940.
