= Saint Lucia dollar =

The history of currency in the British colony of Saint Lucia closely follows that of the British Eastern Caribbean territories in general. Even though Queen Anne's proclamation of 1704 brought the gold standard to the West Indies, silver pieces of eight (Spanish dollars and later Mexican dollars) continued to form a major portion of the circulating currency right into the latter half of the nineteenth century.

Britain adopted the gold standard in 1821 and an imperial order-in-council of 1838 resulted in Saint Lucia formally adopting the British sterling coinage in the year 1851. However, despite the circulation of British coins in St. Lucia, the silver pieces of eight continued to circulate alongside them and the private sector continued to use dollar accounts for reckoning. The international silver crisis of 1873 signalled the end of the silver dollar era in the West Indies, and silver dollars were demonetized in St. Lucia in 1882. This left a state of affairs, in which the British coinage circulated, being reckoned in dollar accounts at an automatic conversion rate of 1 dollar = 4 shillings 2 pence.

From 1949, with the introduction of the British West Indies dollar, the currency of St. Lucia became officially tied up with that of the British Eastern Caribbean territories in general. The British sterling coinage was eventually replaced by a new decimal coinage in 1955, with the new cent being equal to one half of the old penny.

== History ==
From 1851, the British pound circulated on Saint Lucia, replacing the Saint Lucia livre. Sometime after 1882, private banknotes, denominated in dollars, began to be issued on the island. From 1920, some of these notes also bore the value in sterling, with 1 dollar = 4 shillings 2 pence. During this period, no subdivision of the dollar was issued and British coins continued to circulate. The government of Saint Lucia also issued paper money in 1920, denominated in sterling.

In 1935, the British West Indies dollar was established, equal in value to the earlier Saint Lucia dollar and other similar issues elsewhere in the British West Indies. The last distinct issues of banknotes were made for Saint Lucia in 1940. Since 1965, the East Caribbean States dollar has circulated.

== Banknotes ==
Three banks, the Royal Bank of Canada, the Colonial Bank and Barclays Bank, all issued 5 dollars notes. The Royal Bank of Canada issued notes in 1920, whilst the Colonial Bank issued notes until 1926 and Barclays Bank (which took over the Colonial Bank) issued notes between 1926 and 1940.
