= Jamaican pound =

Official currency of Jamaica (1840–1969)

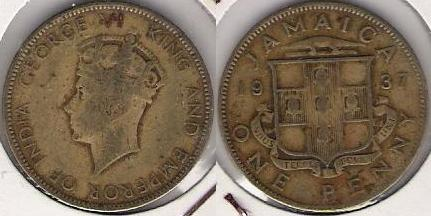
- 1d of 1937

Unit
- Symbol: £

Denominations
- Subunit
- 1/20: shilling
- 1/240: penny
- Symbol
- shilling: s or /–
- penny: d
- Banknotes: 5/–, 10/–, £1, £5
- Coins: 1/2d, 1d, 1 1/2d, 3d, 6d, 1/–, 2/–, 2/6, 5/–

Demographics
- Date of withdrawal: 8 September 1969
- Replaced by: Jamaican dollar
- User(s): Jamaica

Issuance
- Central bank: Commissioners of Currency (1920-1961); Bank of Jamaica (1961-1969)
- Website: www.boj.org.jm
- This infobox shows the latest status before this currency was rendered obsolete.

The pound was the official currency of Jamaica between 1840 and 1969. It circulated as a mixture of sterling coinage and locally issued coins and banknotes and was always equal to the pound sterling. The Jamaican pound was also used in the Cayman and Turks and Caicos Islands.

== History ==
The history of currency in Jamaica should be considered in the wider picture of the currencies of the British West Indies. Jamaica was the only British West Indies territory to use special regional issues of the sterling coinage. (Note: Rare exceptions to this are a copper penny issued in the Bahamas in 1806, and the four pence coin which was specially issued for all the British West Indies, and later only for British Guiana.)

The earliest money used in Jamaica was the Spanish copper maravedí. For nearly four hundred years Spanish dollars, known as pieces of eight, were in widespread use on the world's trading routes, including the Caribbean Sea region. However, following the revolutionary wars in Latin America, the source of these silver trade coins dried up. The last Spanish dollar was minted at the Potosi mint in 1825. The United Kingdom had adopted the gold standard in 1821, and so 1825 was an opportune time to introduce the sterling coinage into all the British colonies. An imperial order-in-council was passed in that year for the purposes of facilitating this aim by making sterling coinage legal tender in the colonies at the specified rate of one Spanish dollar equalling four shillings and four pence sterling. However, since sterling was under a gold standard, this exchange rate did not realistically represent the value of the silver in the Spanish dollars compared to the value of the gold in the British gold sovereign. Therefore, the order-in-council had, in many colonies, the effect of actually driving out sterling coinage rather than encouraging its circulation. Remedial legislation had to be introduced in 1838 to introduced the more realistic rate of one dollar equalling 4/2 sterling. However, in Jamaica, British Honduras, Bermuda, and later also in the Bahamas, the official rating was set aside in favour of what was known as the 'Maccaroni' tradition, where a British shilling, referred to as a 'Maccaroni', was treated as one quarter of a dollar. The common link between these four territories was the Bank of Nova Scotia which brought in the 'Maccaroni' tradition, resulting in the successful introduction of both sterling coinage and sterling accounts. In 1834 silver coins of threepence and three halfpennies (1 1/2 pence) were introduced, valued at 1/2 real and 1/4 real. The three halfpenny came to be called "quartile" or "quatties". These, in particular, were used in church collections due to a belief among the black population that copper coins were inappropriate for that purpose. Hence, they came to be called "Christian quatties".

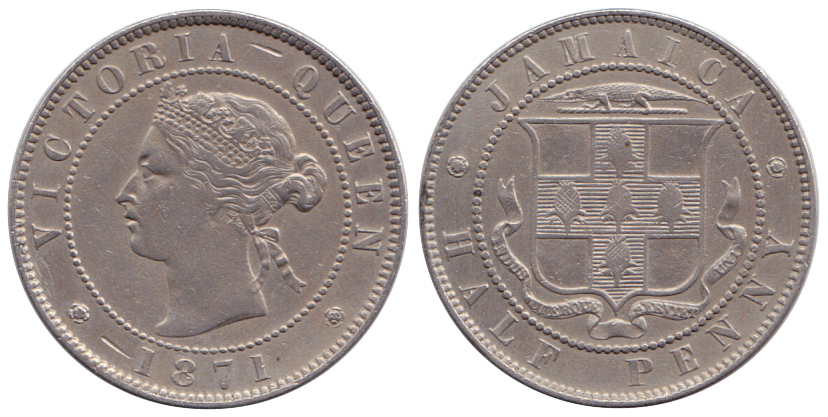
Half Penny 1871, Queen Victoria

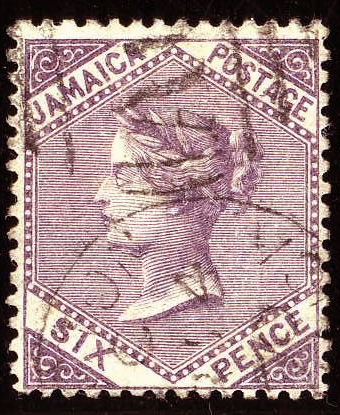
Jamaican 6d stamp, 1860

In 1839 an act was passed by British Parliament declaring that as of December 31, 1840, only sterling coinage would be legal tender in Jamaica, demonetising all of the Spanish coins, with the exception of the gold doubloon which was valued at £3 4s. Coins in use were thus the farthing (1/4d), halfpenny (1/2d), penny (1d), three halfpenny (1 1/2d), threepence (3d), sixpence (6d), shilling (1/–), florin (2/–), half-crown (2/6), and crown (5/–).

The emancipation of the slaves in 1838 increased the need for coinage in Jamaica, particularly low denomination coins, but black Jamaicans were still reluctant to use copper coins. The solution was to use cupronickel, adopted in 1869. Penny and halfpennies were minted for use in Jamaica, becoming the first truly Jamaican coins. Beginning in 1880, the farthing was also minted in cupronickel.

In 1904, the Currency Notes Law was passed, “constituting a Board of Commissioners to issue notes called currency notes for the value of 10 shillings each,” although no such notes were issued at that time. This law was amended by Law 17 of 1918 which authorised “the issue of currency notes for such denominations as may be approved.” The Commissioners of Currency issued the first notes under these laws on 15 March 1920, in the denominations of 2/6, 5/–, and 10/–, with each note carrying the inscription that they were “Issued under the authority of Law 27 of 1904 & Law 17 of 1918.” Only these three smaller denominations were issued by the Board of Commissioners; £1 and £5 notes were issued by the chartered banks operating in Jamaica. However, in 1940, the government began producing £1 and £5 notes.

In October 1960, the Bank of Jamaica was given the sole right to mint coins and produce banknotes in Jamaica. Their notes were issued on May 1, 1961, in denominations of 5/–, 10/–, £1 and £5.

On January 30, 1968, the Jamaican House of Representatives voted to decimalise the currency, introducing a new dollar worth 10/–, and divided into 100 cents (1 cent thus being equal to exactly 1^{1}/_{5}d). At the time, coins of 1 cent (1^{1}/_{5}d), 5 cents (6d), 10 cents (1/–), 20 cents (2/–) and 25 cents (2/6) were produced and banknotes of 50 cents (5/–), $1 (10/–), $2 (£1), and $10 (£5). These coins and banknotes went into circulation on September 8, 1969.

The new Jamaican dollar (and the Cayman Islands dollar) differed from all the other dollars in the British West Indies in that it was essentially a ten shilling sterling unit, similar to the way decimalisation was carried out in Australia, New Zealand and South Africa; the other dollars in the West Indies either began on the US dollar unit or the Spanish dollar unit.

Image	Denomination	Obverse	Reverse
	5/–	Queen Elizabeth II	Dunn's River Falls
	10/–	Queen Elizabeth II	Banana plantation
	£1	Queen Elizabeth II	Harvesting
	£5	Queen Elizabeth II	Storage plant, woman with fruit basket
