= Guyanese dollar =

Currency of Guyana

Banknote
Coin

ISO 4217
- Code: GYD (numeric: 328)
- Subunit: 0.01

Unit
- Symbol: $, G$, GY$

Denominations
- Subunit
- 1/100: cent
- Banknotes: $20, $50, $100, $500, $1000, $2000, $5000
- Coins: $1, $5, $10

Demographics
- User(s): Guyana

Issuance
- Central bank: Bank of Guyana
- Website: www.bankofguyana.org.gy

Valuation
- Inflation: 5.8%
- Source: , 2022

The Guyanese dollar (currency sign: $, G$ and GY$; ISO: GYD) has been the unit of account in Guyana (formerly British Guiana) since 29 January 1839. Originally it was intended as a transitional unit to facilitate the changeover from the Dutch guilder system of currency to the British pound sterling system. The Spanish dollar was already prevalent throughout the West Indies in general, and from 1839, the Spanish dollar unit operated in British Guiana in conjunction with British sterling coins at a standard conversion rate of one dollar for every four shillings and twopence. In 1951 the British sterling coinage was replaced with a new decimal coinage which was simultaneously introduced through all the British territories in the Eastern Caribbean. When sterling began to depreciate in the early 1970s, a switch to a US dollar peg became increasingly attractive as an anti-inflationary measure and the Eastern Caribbean Currency Authority (of which Guyana was a member) made the switch in October 1975. The Guyanese dollar is normally abbreviated with the dollar sign $, or alternatively G$ to distinguish it from other dollar-denominated currencies.

== History ==
The history of the Guyanese dollar should not be considered apart from the wider picture surrounding the history of currency in the British West Indies as a whole. (See also Currencies of the British West Indies). The aspects of that history that are peculiar to British Guiana are the continued use of the four pence groat coin when all other territories had abandoned it, and also the use of dollar accounts in both the public and private sectors since 1839. In the other Eastern Caribbean territories, there was a mixture of dollar and sterling accounts until 1951.

The Dutch territories of Essequibo, Demerara, and Berbice on the north coast of South America, created in early 17th century, came under the control of the British during the Napoleonic Wars. These territories were formally ceded to the United Kingdom in 1815 and united to become the colony of British Guiana in 1831. At first, the British introduced a British variety of the Dutch guilder currency into this territory. Then in 1839, the Spanish dollar as a unit of account was introduced in order to facilitate the introduction of British sterling silver coinage. The rationale behind this lies in the fact that Spanish silver dollars, alternatively known as pieces of eight, were already circulating alongside the Dutch coinage, and also widely throughout the Eastern Caribbean. The dollar unit of account therefore acted as a convenient intermediary conversion unit between sterling and the outgoing guilder unit. The dollar unit was equivalent to 4 shillings 2 pence sterling and replaced the guilder unit at a rate of 1 dollar = 3 1/8 guilders, i.e. £1 = $4.80 = 15 guilders.

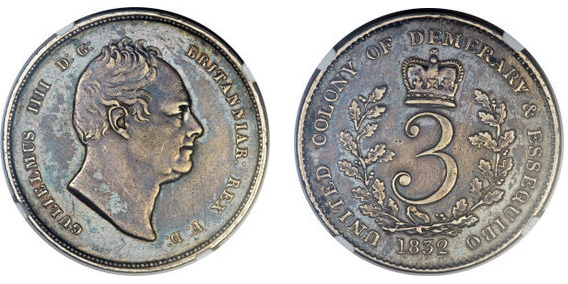
A 3 Guilder coin minted for the colonies of Demerara and Essequibo

A particular feature of the circulation of British silver coins in British Guiana was the popularity of the 4d (four pence) coin, known as the groat. This was a direct consequence of its equivalence to the very popular outgoing 'bit' coin which was equal to one quarter of a guilder. When the groat coin ceased to circulate in the United Kingdom in the latter half of the nineteenth century, a special request was made in 1888 for groats to be struck for use in the British West Indies and British Guiana. These were first struck in 1891. From 1917 they were struck exclusively for use in British Guiana.

Spanish, Mexican, and Colombian silver dollars continued to circulate alongside the British sterling coinage until 1876 when these dollar coins were demonetised.

The Spanish dollar unit should not be confused with the American dollar unit. The American dollar unit was first introduced in the US in 1792, based on the average weight of a selection of worn Spanish dollars. As such, the American dollar was marginally less valuable than the Spanish dollar.

== Coins ==
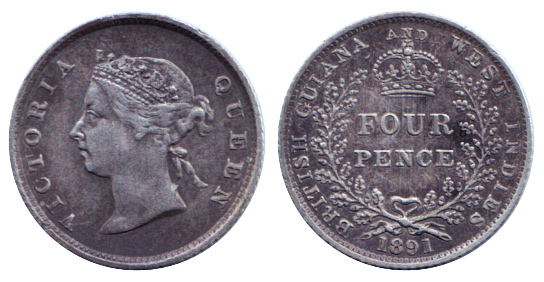
4 pence 1891 for British Guiana and the West Indies

After the introduction of the dollar, regular British coins circulated, together with 2 and 4 pence coins also issued elsewhere in the British West Indies. The 2 pence coins issued in 1838, 1843 and 1848 were of the standard Maundy money type, whilst the 4 pence coins bore an image of Britannia. Between 1891 and 1916, 4 pence coins were issued specifically for "British Guiana and West Indies" and between 1917 and 1945 for "British Guiana". 1916 also saw the first issue of paper money by the Government of British Guiana, in denominations of 1, 2, 5, 20 and 100 dollars.

In 1967, coins were introduced in denominations of 1, 5, 10, 25 and 50 cents. The 1 and 5 cents were struck in Nickel-brass, with the other denominations struck in cupro-nickel. The coins ceased to be legal tender in 1992. In 1996, high inflation caused the introduction of 1, 5 and 10 dollars coins. The 1 and 5 dollars are struck in copper-plated steel, whilst the 10 dollars is struck in nickel-plated steel and has an equilateral-curved heptagonal shape.

In August, 2020, the $100 coin was launched. The coin is the first coloured coin issued by the Bank of Guyana.

== Banknotes ==
Private banknotes were introduced in the late 19th century by the British Guiana Bank and the Colonial Bank. Both issued 5, 20 and 100 dollars. The British Guiana Bank issued notes until 1907, with the Colonial Bank issuing notes until 1917. The Colonial Bank was taken over by Barclays Bank, which issued notes in denominates of 5, 10, 20 and 100 dollars between 1926 and 1941.

In 1909, the Royal Bank of Canada introduced 100 dollar notes, followed in 1913 by 5 and 20 dollars notes. From 1920, the notes also bore the denomination in sterling. 100 dollars were issued until 1920, with the 5 and 20 dollars issued until 1938.

Paper money production specifically for British Guiana ceased in 1942 and local notes were replaced by BWI$ notes in 1951. In 1955, the BWI$ was decimalized and coinage was issued in the name of the "British Caribbean Territories, Eastern Group". In 1965, the East Caribbean dollar (EC$) replaced the BWI$ and circulated in British Guiana for a year until, following independence in 1966, the Guyanese dollar was introduced, replacing the East Caribbean dollar at par.

Banknotes were introduced on 15 November 1965 in denominations of 1, 5, 10, and 20 dollars. A second series issued between 1988 and 1992 consisted of 20, 100, and 500 dollar denominations. The 1996–1999 series included 20, 100, 500, and 1000 dollars. The 2000–2002 series included 500 and 1000 dollar notes. New banknotes of 100 and 1000 dollars were issued on 29 March 2006. The 100-dollar note is similar to the preceding issue of the same denomination, except the design has been slightly modified with larger numerals for the denomination in the upper left front corner, a different screen trap background pattern, and shortened printer imprint. Both notes now have designs that extend to the borders and watermarks that include an electrotype map of Guyana. The 2011 issue included 500 and 1000 dollars with brand new security features, the most notable is the holographic stripe with a colorful macaw replacing the OVD patch used on the previous issues. On November 15, 2013, the Bank of Guyana unveiled the 5,000-dollar note which was issued on December 9. However, there have not been any plans for a circulating non-commemorative 10,000-dollar note for Guyana as of yet. In February 2022, the Bank of Guyana unveiled the 2,000 dollar note.

== Commemorative banknotes ==
- N.D. (2016) 50 Dollars - 50 Years of Independence.
- N.D. (2021) 2,000 Dollars - 55 Years of Independence - being released in late February 2022. This will be the first polymer banknote for Guyana.

Current GYD exchange rates
| From Google Finance: | AUD CAD CHF CNY EUR GBP HKD JPY USD JPY USD |
| From Yahoo! Finance: | AUD CAD CHF CNY EUR GBP HKD JPY USD JPY USD |
| From XE.com: | AUD CAD CHF CNY EUR GBP HKD JPY USD JPY USD |
| From OANDA: | AUD CAD CHF CNY EUR GBP HKD JPY USD JPY USD |

== See also ==
- Economy of Guyana
- Surinamese dollar
