= Grenadian dollar =

The history of currency in the British colony of Grenada closely follows that of the British Eastern Caribbean territories in general. Even though Queen Anne's proclamation of 1704 brought the gold standard to the West Indies, silver pieces of eight (Spanish dollars and later Mexican dollars) continued to form a major portion of the circulating currency right into the latter half of the nineteenth century.

Britain adopted the gold standard in 1821 and an imperial order-in-council of 1838 resulted in Grenada formally adopting the sterling currency in the year 1840. However, despite the circulation of British coins in Grenada, the silver pieces of eight continued to circulate alongside them and the private sector continued to use dollar accounts for reckoning. The international silver crisis of 1873 signalled the end of the silver dollar era in the West Indies and silver dollars were demonetized in Grenada in 1878. This left a state of affairs in which the British coinage circulated, being reckoned in dollar accounts at an automatic conversion rate of 1 dollar = 4 shillings 2 pence.

From 1949, with the introduction of the British West Indies dollar, the currency of Grenada became officially tied up with that of the British Eastern Caribbean territories in general. The British sterling coinage was eventually replaced by a new decimal coinage in 1955, with the new cent being equal to one half of the old penny.

== Early history ==
The currency comprised various cut Spanish dollars and other Spanish colonial coins. The dollar was subdivided into bits (worth 9 pence). Before 1814, there were 11 bits to the dollar, with the issue of 1787 consisting of Spanish dollars cut into 11 segments and stamped with a "G". After 1814, there were 12 bits to the dollar. 1 bit pieces were made from 2 reales coins cut into thirds, whilst 2 and 4 bit pieces were made from 4 reales coins cut into sixths and third, respectively, and 6 bit pieces were produced from 8 reales coins cut in half. All were stamped with a "G", their value in bits and either "TR" or "GS". In 1840, sterling was established as the official currency of the island. In 1909, the first private banknotes were issued, denominated in dollars. These circulated alongside sterling and government paper money (denominated in sterling) issued in 1920. From 1920, some of the private banknotes were also denominated in sterling, with 1 dollar = 4 shillings 2 pence. In 1935, the British West Indies dollar was introduced, equal in value to the Grenadan dollar and other dollars circulating in the British West Indies. Private banks continued to issue notes until 1941. The British West Indies dollar was replaced in 1965 by the East Caribbean dollar.

=== Banknotes ===
The Royal Bank of Canada introduced 5 dollar notes in 1909, continuing to issue them until 1938. The Colonial Bank issued 5 dollars notes until 1926, after which Barclays Bank (which had taken over the Colonial Bank) began issuing 5 dollars notes and continued until 1941.
