= Dominican dollar =

The history of currency in the British colony of Dominica closely follows that of the British Eastern Caribbean territories in general. Even though Queen Anne's proclamation of 1704 brought the gold standard to the West Indies, silver pieces of eight (Spanish dollars and later Mexican dollars) continued to form a major portion of the circulating currency right into the latter half of the nineteenth century.

Britain adopted the gold standard in 1821 and an imperial order-in-council of 1838 resulted in Dominica formally adopting the sterling currency in the year 1842. However, despite the circulation of British silver coins in Dominica, the silver pieces of eight continued to circulate alongside them, and the private sector continued to use dollar accounts for reckoning. The international silver crisis of 1873 signalled the end of the silver dollar era in the West Indies and silver dollars were demonetized in Dominica in the wake of this crisis for fear that a silver standard might return. Even though the British sterling coins were made of silver, they were fractional coins of the British gold sovereign and hence they maintained their gold value. This left a state of affairs, in which the British coinage circulated, being reckoned in dollar accounts at an automatic conversion rate of 1 dollar = 4 shillings 2 pence.

From 1949, with the introduction of the British West Indies dollar, the currency of Dominica became officially tied up with that of the British Eastern Caribbean territories in general. The British sterling coinage was eventually replaced by a new decimal coinage in 1955, with the new cent being equal to one half of the old penny.

The fixed exchange rate of $4.80 = £1 sterling (equivalent to the old $1 = 4s 2d) continued right up until 1976.

== Early history ==
The first dollar consisted of various cut or holed Spanish dollars and other Spanish colonial coins. The dollar was subdivided into bits (worth 9 pence). Before 1813, there were 11 bits to the holed dollar (12 1/2 bits to an unholed dollar). After 1813, there were 16 bits to the holed dollar (18 bits to an unholed dollar). In 1842, sterling was established as the official currency of the island.

The first series of coins was produced between 1791 and 1798 in denominations of 1 1/2, 5 1/2 and 11 bits, with the 5 1/2 bits holed 4 reales coins, the 11 bits holed 8 reales coins and the 1 1/2 bits the plugs from producing the 11 bits coins.

The second series was issued in 1813 and consisted of 3, 4, 6, 12 and 16 bits. The 12 and 16 bits were holed 8 reales coins, with the plugs from the 12 bits used to make the other coins. Whole plugs made the 6 bits, halved plugs made the 3 bits and the plugs were themselves holed to make the 4 bits.

The third series was issued between 1816 and 1818 and consisted of 2 bits and 2 shillings 6 pence (marked 2/6, equal to 3 1/3 bits). The 2 bits were holed 2 reales coins whilst the 2/6 coins were quartered 8 reales coins.

In 1913, the first private banknotes were issued, denominated in dollars. From 1920, some of these notes were also denominated in sterling, with 1 dollar = 4 shillings 2 pence. In 1935, the British West Indies dollar was introduced, equal in value to the Dominican dollar and other dollars circulating in the British West Indies. Private banks continued to issue notes until 1941. The British West Indies dollar was replaced in 1965 by the East Caribbean dollar.

=== Banknotes ===
The Royal Bank of Canada introduced 5 dollar notes in 1913, continuing to issue them until 1938. The Colonial Bank issued 5 dollars notes until 1926, after which Barclays Bank (which had taken over the Colonial Bank) began issuing 5 dollars notes and continued until 1941.
