= Sterling area =

Currencies linked to the pound sterling

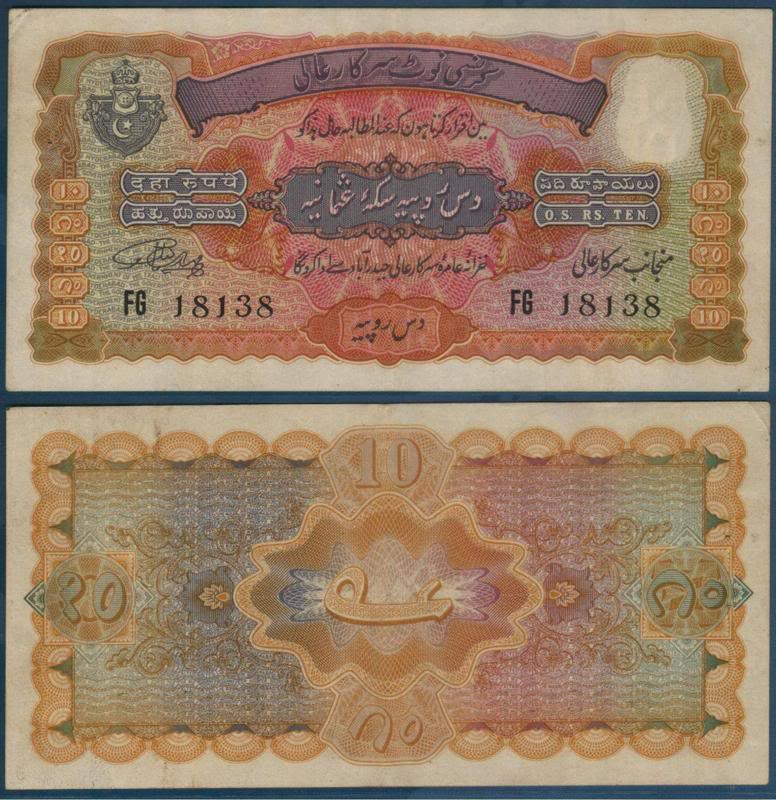
The Indian Rupee was one of the currencies of the sterling area.

The sterling area (or sterling bloc, legally scheduled territories) was a group of countries that either adopted or pegged their currencies to the pound sterling.

The area began to appear informally during the early 1930s, after sterling had left the gold standard in 1931, with the result that a number of currencies of countries that historically had performed a large amount of their trade in sterling were pegged to sterling instead of to gold. A large number of these countries were part of the British Empire; however, a significant minority were not.

Early in the Second World War, emergency legislation united the sterling bloc countries and territories (except Hong Kong) of the British Empire in a single exchange control area to protect the external value of sterling, among other aims. Canada and Newfoundland were already linked to the US dollar and did not join the sterling bloc.

The Bank of England in London guided co-ordination of monetary policy in the currency area. Member countries with their own currency held a large portion of their foreign currency reserves as sterling balances in London.

After the Second World War, the Bretton Woods system of fixed exchange rates to the US dollar (convertible to gold) gave the sterling area a second lease of life as Commonwealth of Nations kinship and trading loyalties were maintained after Britain's withdrawal from Empire by keeping a sterling peg and staying in the sterling area, rather than maintaining a direct dollar peg. Despite this, sterling did not regain anything like its place in international commerce that it had had before the war, and a devastated and financially exhausted Britain could not defend the international value of sterling to maintain confidence in the system, resulting in its devaluation of the pound sterling against the dollar in 1967 that was not reflected in other sterling area currencies. In the end the US dollar's inability to hold to the Bretton Woods gold standard precipitated the end of the era of fixed exchange rates: with all major currencies, including the pound, floating against the US dollar, the sterling area had lost its final raison d'être.

In June 1972, the British government unilaterally applied exchange controls to the other sterling area countries, with the exception of the Republic of Ireland, the Isle of Man and the Channel Islands. This arguably marked the end of the sterling area. During the rest of the 1970s and early 1980s, the remaining sterling balances were wound down to a level that represented the significance of Britain in contemporary world trade.

== Purpose ==
Before the First World War, the British pound sterling was the most important international currency, and the City of London was the world's most important financial centre. More than 60 percent of global trade was financed, invoiced, and settled in sterling, and the largest proportion of official reserves, apart from gold, was held in sterling. Although not all the territories of the British Empire used sterling as their local currency, most of those that did not pegged their local currency at a fixed rate to sterling, as did many foreign countries outside the Empire. When Britain left the gold standard in 1931, many countries that had pegged their currencies to gold pegged their currencies to sterling instead; this group of countries became known as the "sterling bloc", though the term "sterling area" was used officially from at least 1935. When the Second World War broke out, the sterling bloc countries within the British Empire shared a desire to protect the external value of sterling; legislation was therefore passed throughout the Empire formalising the British sterling bloc countries into a single exchange control area. The sterling area was continued in the postwar era in an attempt to preserve the British Empire's superpower status during the Cold War between the United States and the Soviet Union.

== Canada and Newfoundland ==
Canada and Newfoundland did not join the sterling area because their dollar currencies had effectively been linked to the US dollar (since 1858). In 1931, Britain and its Dominions abandoned the gold standard during the Great Depression. But while Australia, New Zealand, and South Africa all responded to the end of the gold standard by pegging their pounds to the pound sterling, Canada and Newfoundland instead pegged their dollars to the US dollar. So Canada and Newfoundland did not stand to gain by joining an exchange control bloc intended to protect the external value of sterling. The absence of Canada and Newfoundland from the sterling area was beneficial to Britain, as it curtailed capital flight to the North American mainland. Canada nevertheless introduced its own exchange controls at the outbreak of war; these were maintained until 1953. (Note: Exchange controls were governed by the Foreign Exchange Control Board, initially constituted under the War Measures Act in 1939, and continued by the Foreign Exchange Control Act in 1946. Repealed R.S., 1952, c. 315, s. 30.) Canada's exchange controls were 'sterling area-friendly', in that their purpose was more to prevent capital flight to the US than to prevent flight to the sterling area.

== Hong Kong ==
Hong Kong originally declined to join the sterling area, due to its traditional use of the Spanish dollar. After the end of the Second World War, the Hong Kong dollar was re-pegged to sterling at a fixed rate identical to the pre-war level. Nevertheless, its unique geo-economic position afforded Hong Kong the ability to defy exchange controls by operating a dual system with the sterling area and a free exchange market principally with the US dollar, which was technically illegal from 1949 to 1967. In the 1967 sterling crisis, Hong Kong only partially followed Britain in devaluing its currency. In 1972, Hong Kong finally ended the currency peg with sterling.

== Member benefits ==
At the end of the war in 1945 the sterling area remained the largest and most coherent currency bloc in the world, and it provided its members with freedom to settle payments in sterling anywhere within the area without exchange controls. Members enjoyed the benefits of stable exchange rates and permanent access to the financial resources of the City of London. Meanwhile, the British government was able to use the pooled reserves of the entire area's membership to back sterling at times when there was a US dollar shortage.

== Demise ==
Towards the end of the 1950s, with the British Empire in decline, political opinion rapidly shifted towards the view that trade with Europe was more important to the future of the United Kingdom than the historical preferential trading with the Commonwealth nations. This resulted in the UK attempting to join the European Communities (E.C) (the Common Market), formed in 1957. The UK government devalued the pound sterling in November 1967 from £1 = $2.80 to £1 = $2.40. This was not welcomed in many parts of the sterling area, and, unlike in the 1949 devaluation, many sterling area countries did not devalue their currencies at the same time. This was the beginning of the end for the sterling area. The Basel agreements of 1968 were designed to minimise flight from sterling to the US dollar. On 22 June 1972, Britain imposed exchange controls between Britain and other members of the sterling area, with the exception of the Republic of Ireland and the Crown Dependencies (the Isle of Man and the Channel Islands). At the same time, Britain floated the pound sterling. According to the Chancellor of the Exchequer, Anthony Barber, this was to halt a recent increase in capital outflow to other parts of the sterling area.

Opponents of these changes argued that the real reason for them was Britain's impending entry to the EEC, and that France was concerned about Britain's close economic ties with the Commonwealth and the sterling area, even though France continued to have special economic relations with its less successful former colonies in the CFA and CFP franc zones. The attempts by the United Kingdom to join the European Economic Community (EEC) in 1961 and 1967 were blocked by the French, but eventually, on 1 January 1973, the United Kingdom became a European Communities member state after France formally lifted its veto on UK membership.

One of the issues covered in the negotiations about the United Kingdom's entry to the EEC was the problem of "sterling balances", balances held in sterling in London by governments of countries which were members of the sterling area, in many cases the result of debts incurred by Britain during the war. France argued that these obligations were potentially a threat to the stability of the pound, and that this could cause turbulence for the whole of the EEC. Agreement on winding down these balances was thus a necessary part of the agreement for Britain to join the EEC, and removed the main reason for continuing the area.

Gibraltar was re-included into the new miniature sterling area on 1 January 1973, and the other sterling area countries responded as they chose – in fact, some of these countries had already taken similar measures throughout the 1950s and 1960s. Following the British government's decision in June 1972, some countries immediately copied the British government, and others did so over the next few months. Singapore continued operating sterling area exchange controls until as late as 1978, and Brunei did not alter its sterling area exchange controls until the year 2001.

After 1972 the sterling area was no longer what it had been, but the United Kingdom still recognised the existence of the 'overseas sterling area' as a distinct group of countries for the purposes of exchange control policy. In 1979, due to an improving economic situation and changed patterns of trade between Britain and the rest of the Commonwealth, Britain removed all its exchange controls: the sterling area had effectively ceased to exist.

The United Kingdom's efforts to join the EEC, from 1961 until its attainment of EEC membership in 1973, slowly phased out the privileged commercial ties of the rest of the Commonwealth with the United Kingdom. A period after 1973 saw further decline to the special trade links the Commonwealth nations had with the United Kingdom, and ended their privileged access to UK markets. Most members of the sterling area left the bloc to peg their currencies with the United States dollar.

== List of original member countries ==
- (Aden Colony) Aden and later South Yemen
- Sudan
- Australia until 1910
- (The Bahamas) Bahamas
- Bahrain
- Bangladesh
- Barbados
- Basutoland (Lesotho)
- Bermuda
- Botswana
- British Antarctic Territory
- British Guiana (Guyana)
- British Honduras (Belize)
- British Indian Ocean Territory
- British Virgin Islands
- Brunei
- (Myanmar) Burma (left in 1966)
- Cayman Islands
- (Dominion of Ceylon) Ceylon (Sri Lanka)
- Cyprus
- Egypt (left in 1947)
- Fiji
- The Gambia
- Ghana
- Gilbert and Ellice Islands (Kiribati and Tuvalu)
- British Hong Kong (until 1972)
- Iceland
- (Republic of Ireland) Ireland (until 30 March 1979)
- Iraq (left in 1959)
- Jamaica
- Jordan
- Kenya
- Kuwait
- (Saint Kitts and Nevis) Leeward Islands (comprising Anguilla, Antigua and Barbuda, Montserrat, and Saint Kitts (Saint Christopher and Nevis))
- Libya (expelled in 1971)
- Malawi
- Malaysia
- (Maldives) Maldive Islands
- Malta
- Mauritius
- Muscat and Oman (Sultanate of Oman)
- Nauru
- New Zealand (including Cook Islands, Niue, and Tokelau Islands)
- Nigeria
- (Mandatory Palestine) British Mandate for Palestine (required to withdraw in 1948, following the creation of the state of Israel)
- Pakistan
- Papua New Guinea
- Pitcairn Islands
- Qatar
- Rhodesia (Zimbabwe) (expelled in 1965)
- Saint Helena (including Ascension Island and Tristan da Cunha)
- Seychelles
- Sierra Leone
- Singapore
- British Solomon Islands Protectorate
- British Somaliland Protectorate (left in 1964)
- (Union of South Africa) South Africa
- South West Africa (Namibia)
- (Eswatini) Swaziland
- Tanganyika
- Tonga
- Trinidad and Tobago
- (Trucial States) Trucial Oman (United Arab Emirates)
- Turks and Caicos Islands
- Uganda
- United Kingdom
- Western Samoa
- Windward Islands (comprising Dominica, Grenada, Saint Lucia, and Saint Vincent and the Grenadines)
- Zambia
- Zanzibar

== See also ==
- List of British currencies
- List of the largest trading partners of United Kingdom
