= Black dog (coin) =

A dog or a black dog was a coin in the Caribbean of Queen Anne of Great Britain, made of pewter or copper, typically worth 1½ pence or 1/72 of a dollar. The name comes from the negative connotations of the word "dog," as they came from debased silver coins, and the dark color of those same debased coins. Black dogs were also at times called "stampes" or "stampees", as they were typically the coins of other colonial powers—French coins worth 2 sous or, equivalently, 24 diniers—stamped to make them British currency.

A dog and a stampee were not necessarily of equal value. For example, the Spanish dollar was subdivided into bits, each worth 9 pence, 6 black dogs or 4 stampees. Before 1811, 1 dollar equalled 11 bits (making a dog 1/66 of a dollar and a stampee 1/44 of a dollar); after 1811, 1 dollar equalled 12 bits (making a dog 1/72 of a dollar and a stampee 1/48 of a dollar). In 1797, however, a "black dog" is equated with a "stampee".

Mary Prince's narrative tells of slaves in Antigua buying a "dog's worth" of salted fish or pork on Sundays (the only day they could go to the market).
