= Potosi, Trelawny, Jamaica =

Potosi
- Estate
- Location within Jamaica
- Coordinates: 18.4296512°N 77.6556975°W
- Country: Jamaica
- Parish: Trelawny

Potosi is a former sugar estate in Trelawny, Jamaica. It was named after a fabled Bolivian silver mine.

== History ==
The estate originally belonged to Thomas Partridge of St. James. His son, also named Thomas, inherited the property and, upon the son's death, ownership passed to his two sisters, including Elizabeth.

Elizabeth married John Tharp in 1766 and on December 31, 1766, Articles of Agreement were signed "granting to John Tharp, husband of Elizabeth joint devisee with her sister under the Will of Thomas Partridge her brother to Potosi and Flamstead Estates, management of same until said devisees are both of age". This was the beginning of Tharp's collection of properties on the Martha Brae River.

John Tharp died in 1804, and the estate was inherited by John Tharp the younger. In April 1836 there were 224 enslaved Africans on the estate, and John Tharp received £4,494 17s 8d compensation when they were emancipated.

The ruins of the Works now belong to the Muschett family of Wales Estate, while the Great House ruins and both banks of the river belong to a Mr Parkin. One special feature of the factory remains is a cut-stone chute which carried cane from the hillside down to the valley floor.
