= Economy of the Cayman Islands =

Economy of Cayman Islands
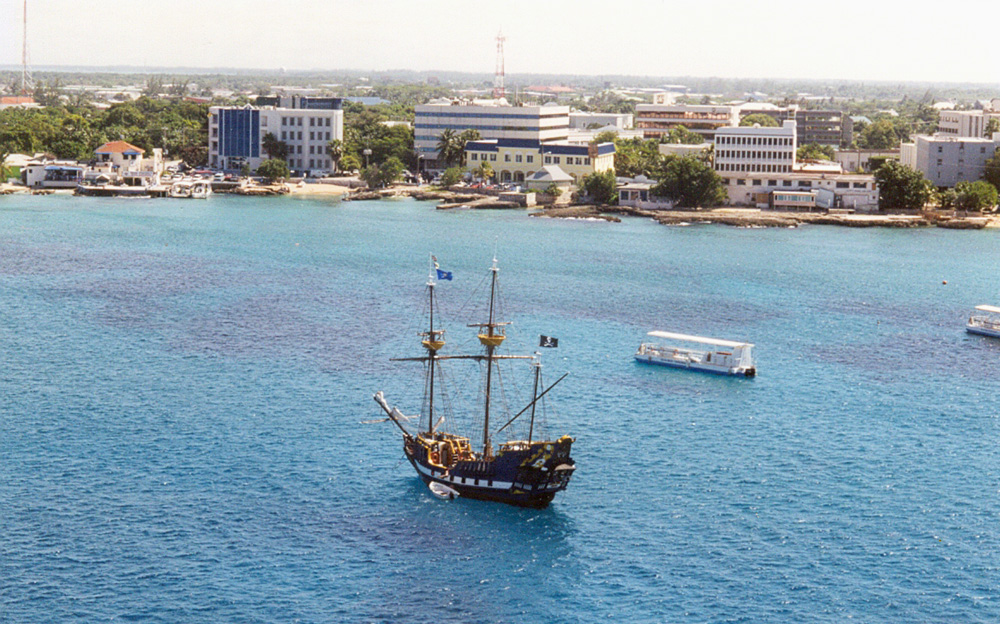
- Currency: Cayman Islands dollar (KYD)
- Fixed exchange rates: 1.00 KYD = 1.20 USD
- Fiscal year: 1 April – 31 March
- Country group: Developed/Advanced; High-income economy

Statistics
- Population: ▲84,738 (2022)
- GDP: ▲$7.139 billion (2023 est., nominal) $2.507 billion (2021, PPP)
- GDP rank: 161st (nominal); 191st (PPP)
- GDP growth: 4.0% (2023)
- GDP per capita: ▲$109,684 (2023)
- GDP by sector: Agriculture: 0.3% Industry: 28.2% Services: 71.5% (2014)
- Inflation (CPI): 1% (2014)
- Population below national poverty line: 1.9% (2009)
- Gini coefficient: ▼0.3995 (2010)
- Human Development Index: ▲0.984 (2022)
- Labour force: ▲60,513 (2023)
- Labour force by occupation: Agriculture: 1.9% Manual industry: 19.1% Finance, law and tourism: 79%
- Unemployment: ▼2.1% (2022)

External
- Exports: $15.2 million (2014 est.)
- Export goods: Turtle products, manufactured consumer goods
- Imports: $705.3 million (2014 est.)
- Import goods: Foodstuffs, manufactured goods, fuels
- All values, unless otherwise stated, are in US dollars.

The economy of the Cayman Islands, a British overseas territory located in the western Caribbean Sea, is mainly fueled by the tourism sector and by the financial services sector, together representing 50–60 percent of the country's gross domestic product (GDP). The Cayman Islands Investment Bureau, a government agency, has been established with the mandate of promoting investment and economic development in the territory. Because of the territory's strong economy and it being a popular banking destination for wealthy individuals and businesses, it is often dubbed the "financial capital" of the Caribbean. The Cayman Islands enjoys the strongest and one of the most stable economies in the Caribbean.

The emergence of what is now considered the Cayman Islands' "twin pillars of economic development" (tourism and international finance) started in the 1950s with the introduction of modern transportation and telecommunications.

== History ==
From the earliest settlement of the Cayman Islands, economic activity was hindered by isolation and a limited natural resource base. The harvesting of sea turtles to resupply passing sailing ships was the first major economic activity on the islands, but local stocks were depleted by the 1790s. Agriculture, while sufficient to support the small early settler population, has always been limited by the scarcity of arable land. Fishing, shipbuilding, and cotton production boosted the economy during the early days of settlement. In addition, settlers scavenged shipwreck remains from the surrounding coral reefs.

The boom in the Cayman Islands' international finance industry can also be at least partly attributed to the British overseas territory having no direct taxation. A popular legend attributes the tax-free status to the heroic acts of the inhabitants during a maritime tragedy in 1794, often referred to as "Wreck of the Ten Sails". The wreck involved nine British merchant vessels and their naval escort, the frigate HMS Convert, that ran aground on the reefs off Grand Cayman. Due to the rescue efforts by the Caymanians using canoes, the loss of life was limited to eight. However, records from the colonial era indicate that Cayman Islands, then a dependency of Jamaica, was not tax-exempt during the period that followed. In 1803, the inhabitants signed a petition addressed to the Jamaican governor asking him to grant them a tax exemption from the "Transient Tax on Wreck Goods".

Sir Vassel Johnson, the second Caymanian to be knighted, was a pioneer of Cayman's financial services industry. Cayman Islands Past Governor Stuart Jack said. "As one of the architects of modern Cayman, especially the financial industry, Sir Vassel guided the steady growth of these Islands as the first financial secretary. His remarkable vision set the foundation for the prosperity and economic stability of these islands. Without his input, Cayman might well have remained the islands that time forgot."

== International finance ==
The Cayman Islands' tax-free status has attracted numerous banks and other companies to its shores. More than 92,000 companies were registered in the Cayman Islands as of 2014, including almost 600 banks and trust companies, with banking assets exceeding $500 billion. Numerous large corporations are based in the Cayman Islands, including, for example, Semiconductor Manufacturing International Corporation (SMIC). The Cayman Islands Stock Exchange was opened in 1997.

=== Financial services industry ===
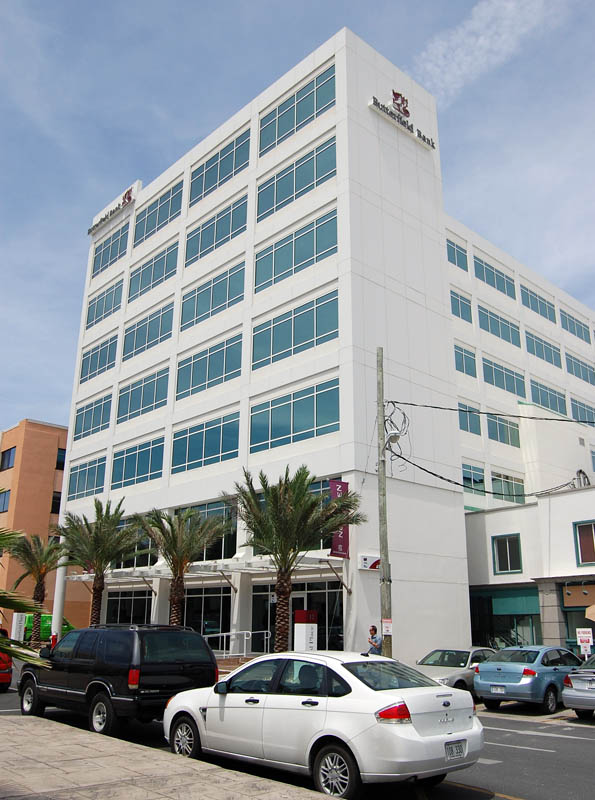
Butterfield Bank in George Town

The Cayman Islands is a major international financial centre. The largest sectors are "banking, hedge fund formation and investment, structured finance and securitisation, captive insurance, and general corporate activities". Regulation and supervision of the financial services industry is the responsibility of the Cayman Islands Monetary Authority (CIMA). Sir Vassel Johnson was a pioneer of Cayman's financial services industry.

Sir Vassel, who became the only Caymanian ever knighted in 1994, served as the Cayman Islands financial secretary from 1965 through 1982 and then as an Executive Council member from 1984 through 1988. In his government roles, Sir Vassel was a driving force in shaping the Cayman Islands financial services industry.

The Cayman Islands is the fifth-largest banking centre in the world, with $1.5 trillion in banking liabilities as of June 2007. In March 2017 there were 158 banks, 11 of which were licensed to conduct banking activities with domestic (Cayman-based) and international clients, and the remaining 147 were licensed to operate on an international basis with only limited domestic activity. Financial services generated KYD$1.2 billion of GDP in 2007 (55% of the total economy), 36% of all employment and 40% of all government revenue. In 2010, the country ranked fifth internationally in terms of value of liabilities booked and sixth in terms of assets booked. It has branches of 40 of the world's 50 largest banks. The Cayman Islands is the second largest captive domicile (Bermuda is largest) in the world with more than 700 captives, writing more than US$7.7 billion of premiums and with US$36.8 billion of assets under management.

There are a number of service providers. These include global financial institutions including HSBC, Deutsche Bank, UBS, and Goldman Sachs; over 80 administrators, leading accountancy practices (incl. the Big Four auditors), and offshore law practices including Maples & Calder. They also include wealth management such as Rothschilds private banking and financial advice.

Since the introduction of the Mutual Funds Law in 1993, which has been copied by jurisdictions around the world, the Cayman Islands has grown to be the world's leading offshore hedge fund jurisdiction. In June 2008, it passed 10,000 hedge fund registrations, and over the year ending June 2008 CIMA reported a net growth rate of 12% for hedge funds.

Starting in the mid-late 1990s, offshore financial centres, such as the Cayman Islands, came under increasing pressure from the OECD for their allegedly harmful tax regimes, where the OECD wished to prevent low-tax regimes from having an advantage in the global marketplace. The OECD threatened to place the Cayman Islands and other financial centres on a "black list" and impose sanctions against them. However, the Cayman Islands successfully avoided being placed on the OECD black list in 2000 by committing to regulatory reform to improve transparency and begin information exchange with OECD member countries about their citizens.

In 2004, under pressure from the UK, the Cayman Islands agreed in principle to implement the European Union Savings Directive (EUSD), but only after securing some important benefits for the financial services industry in the Cayman Islands. As the Cayman Islands is not subject to EU laws, the implementation of the EUSD is by way of bilateral agreements between each EU member state and the Cayman Islands. The government of the Cayman Islands agreed on a model agreement, which set out how the EUSD would be implemented with the Cayman Islands.

A report published by the International Monetary Fund (IMF), in March 2005, assessing supervision and regulation in the Cayman Islands' banking, insurance and securities industries, as well as its money laundering regime, recognised the jurisdiction's comprehensive regulatory and compliance frameworks. "An extensive program of legislative, rule and guideline development has introduced an increasingly effective system of regulation, both formalizing earlier practices and introducing enhanced procedures", noted IMF assessors. The report further stated that "the supervisory system benefits from a well-developed banking infrastructure with an internationally experienced and qualified workforce as well as experienced lawyers, accountants and auditors", adding that, "the overall compliance culture within Cayman is very strong, including the compliance culture related to AML (anti-money laundering) obligations".

On 4 May 2009, the United States President, Barack Obama, declared his intentions to curb the use of financial centres by multinational corporations. In his speech, he singled out the Cayman Islands as a tax shelter. The next day, the Cayman Island Financial Services Association submitted an open letter to the president detailing the Cayman Islands' role in international finance and its value to the US financial system.

The Cayman Islands was ranked as the world's second most significant tax haven on the Tax Justice Network's "Financial Secrecy Index" from 2011, scoring slightly higher than Luxembourg and falling behind only Switzerland. In 2013, the Cayman Islands was ranked by the Financial Secrecy Index as the fourth safest tax haven in the world, behind Hong Kong but ahead of Singapore. In the first conviction of a non-Swiss financial institution for US tax evasion conspiracy, two Cayman Islands financial institutions pleaded guilty in Manhattan Federal Court in 2016 to conspiring to hide more than $130 million in Cayman Islands bank accounts. The companies admitted to helping US clients hide assets in offshore accounts, and agreed to produce account files of non-compliant US taxpayers.

==== Foreign Account Tax Compliance Act ====
On 30 June 2014, the tax jurisdiction of the Cayman Islands was deemed to have an inter-governmental agreement (IGA) with the United States of America with respect to the "Foreign Account Tax Compliance Act" of the United States of America.

The Model 1 Agreement recognizes:

- The Tax Information Exchange Agreement (TIEA) between the United States of America and The Cayman Islands which was signed in London, United Kingdom on 29 November 2013. Page 1 – Clause 2 of the FATCA Agreement.
- The Government of Great Britain and Northern Ireland provided a copy of the Letter of Entrustment which was sent to the Government of the Cayman Islands, to the Government of the United States of America "via diplomatic note of October 16, 2013".
- The Letter of Entrustment dated 20 October 2013, The Govt of Great Britain and Northern Ireland, authorized the Govt of the Cayman Islands to sign an agreement on information exchange to facilitate the Implementation of the Foreign Account Tax Compliance Act – Page 1 – Clause 10.

On 26 March 2017, the US Treasury site disclosed that the Model 1 agreement and related agreement were "In Force" on 1 July 2014.

==== Sanctions and Anti-Money Laundering Act ====
Under the UK Sanctions and Anti-Money Laundering Act of 2018, beneficial ownership of companies in British overseas territories such as the Cayman Islands must be publicly registered for disclosure by 31 December 2020. The Government of the Cayman Islands plans to challenge this law, arguing that it violates the Constitutional sovereignty granted to the islands. The British National Crime Agency said in September 2018 that the authorities in the Cayman Islands were not supplying information about the beneficial ownership of firms registered in the Cayman Islands.

== Other sectors ==
=== Tourism ===
Tourism is also a mainstay, accounting for about 70% of GDP and 75% of foreign currency earnings. The tourist industry is aimed at the luxury market and caters mainly to visitors from North America. Unspoiled beaches, duty-free shopping, scuba diving, and deep-sea fishing draw almost a million visitors to the islands each year. Due to the well-developed tourist industry, many citizens work in service jobs in that sector.

=== Transport ===
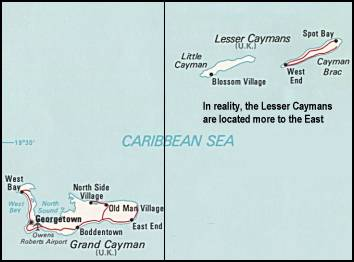
Map of the Cayman Islands, with major roads marked in red.

The transport infrastructure of the Cayman Islands includes a 785 kilometre long public road network with seven active bus routes. There are three airports on the islands.

=== Education ===
Education in the Cayman Islands is compulsory for those aged 4 to 16 and is free to all Caymanian children. The literacy rate for residents over age 15 is 98%. Public schools follow a British-style educational system. The Cayman Islands Education Department operates 10 primary, one special education, and three high schools. In addition, there is a university and a school of law. There are also numerous private schools.

=== Healthcare ===
In 2003, the Cayman Islands became the first country in the world to mandate health insurance for all residents. There are four hospitals in the Cayman Islands. Grand Cayman is home to the private Health City Cayman Islands, as well as the Chrissie Tomlinson Memorial Hospital. The public hospitals are the Cayman Islands Hospital (commonly known as the George Town Hospital); and Faith Hospital on Cayman Brac.

== Diversification ==
The Cayman Islands is seeking to diversify beyond its two traditional industries, and invest in health care and technology. Health City Cayman Islands, opened in 2014, is a medical tourism hospital in East End, led by surgeon Devi Shetty. Cayman Enterprise City is a special economic zone that was opened in 2011 for technology, finance, and education investment. Cayman Sea Salt (producing gourmet sea salt) and Cayman Logwood products are now made in the Cayman Islands.

== Standard of living ==
Because the islands cannot produce enough goods to support the population, about 100% of their food and consumer goods must be imported. In addition, the islands have few natural fresh water resources. Desalination of sea water is used to solve this. Despite those challenges, the Caymanians enjoy one of the highest outputs per capita and one of the highest standards of living in the world.

Education is compulsory to the age of 16 and is free to all Caymanian children. Most schools follow the British educational system. Ten primary, one special education and two high schools ('junior high and senior high') are operated by the government, along with eight private high schools. In addition, there is a law school, a university-college and a medical school.

Poverty relief is provided by the Needs Assessment Unit, a government agency established by the Poor Persons (Relief) Law in January 1964.

The Cayman Islands enjoys the lowest rates of poverty in the Caribbean, with the percentage of the population living below the poverty line being below 1%.

== See also ==
- Economy of the Caribbean
- Cayman Islands dollar
- Cayman Islands Monetary Authority
- Cayman Islands Stock Exchange
- Central banks and currencies of the Caribbean
- List of countries by credit rating
- List of Commonwealth of Nations countries by GDP
- List of Latin American and Caribbean countries by GDP growth
- List of Latin American and Caribbean countries by GDP (nominal)
- List of Latin American and Caribbean countries by GDP (PPP)
- List of countries by tax revenue as percentage of GDP
- List of countries by future gross government debt
- List of countries by leading trade partners
