= List of Latin American countries by Human Development Index =

Map of the Latin American countries by Human Development Index in 2021

The Human Development Index (HDI) is a summary measure of average achievement in key dimensions of human development: a long and healthy life, knowledge, and a decent standard of living. It is a standard means of measuring well-being. It is used to distinguish whether the country is a developed, developing, or underdeveloped country, and also to measure the impact of economic policies on quality of life. Countries fall into four broad categories based on their HDI: very high, high, medium, and low human development.

== List ==
The table below presents the latest Human Development Index (HDI) for countries in Latin America as included in a United Nations Development Programme's Human Development Report (released in 2025). Previous HDI values and rankings are retroactively recalculated using the same updated data sets and current methodologies, as presented in Table 2 of the Statistical Annex of the Human Development Report. The HDI rankings and values in the 2021-22 Human Development Report cannot therefore be compared directly to HDI rankings and values published in previous Human Development Reports.

Rank		Country	Human Development Index (HDI)				
Region	World	Country	HDI value			Change in HDI value 2019–23*	Average annual growth (2010–21)
Region	World	Country	2023	2021	2019	Change in HDI value 2019–23*	Average annual growth (2010–21)
Very high human development
1	45	Chile	0.878	0.855	0.851	▲0.027	▲0.46%
2	47	Argentina	0.865	0.842	0.845	▲0.020	▲0.09%
3	49	Uruguay	0.862	0.809	0.817	▲0.045	▲0.25%
4	59	Panama	0.839	0.805	0.815	▲0.024	▲0.37%
5	62	Costa Rica	0.833	0.809	0.810	▲0.023	▲0.43%
High human development
6	79	Peru	0.794	0.762	0.777	▲0.017	▲0.45%
7	81	Mexico	0.789	0.758	0.779	▲0.010	▲0.15%
8	83	Colombia	0.788	0.752	0.767	▲0.021	▲0.32%
9	84	Brazil	0.786	0.754	0.765	▲0.021	▲0.58%
10	88	Ecuador	0.777	0.740	0.759	▲0.018	▲0.05%
11	89	Dominican Republic	0.776	0.767	0.756	▲0.020	▲0.73%
12	97	Cuba	0.762	0.764	0.783	▼0.021	▼0.19%
13	99	Paraguay	0.756	0.717	0.728	▲0.028	▲0.42%
14	108	Bolivia	0.733	0.692	0.718	▲0.015	▲0.40%
15	121	Venezuela	0.709	0.691	0.711	▼0.002	▼0.80%
16	123	Nicaragua	0.706	0.667	0.660	▲0.046	▲0.76%
Medium human development
17	132	El Salvador	0.678	0.675	0.673	▲0.005	▲0.22%
18	137	Guatemala	0.662	0.627	0.663	▲0.001	▲0.33%
19	139	Honduras	0.645	0.621	0.634	▲0.011	▲0.36%
20	166	Haiti	0.554	0.535	0.510	▲0.044	▲1.94%
*Change in HDI value rounded to three decimals

== See also ==
- Community of Latin American and Caribbean States
- List of countries by Human Development Index
- List of countries by Human Development Index by region
- List of countries by industrial production growth rate
- List of countries by percentage of population living in poverty
- List of Latin American and Caribbean countries by GDP growth
- List of Latin American and Caribbean countries by GDP (nominal)
- List of Latin American and Caribbean countries by GDP (PPP)
- List of Latin American countries by population
