= Association of Caribbean States =

Regional intergovernmental organization

(in other official languages)
Spanish	Asociación de Estados del Caribe
French	Association des États de la Caraïbe
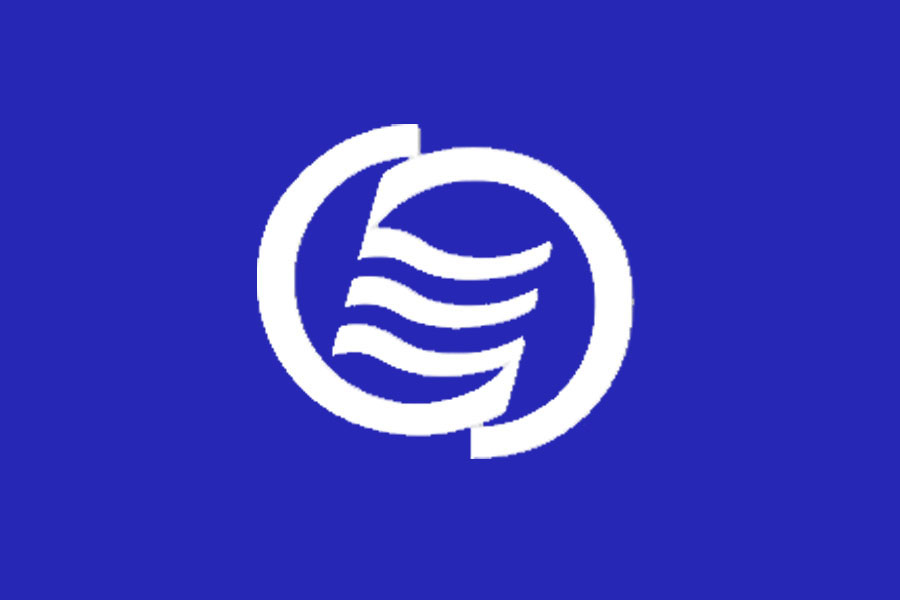
- Flag Logo

- Map indicating ACS members.
- Seat of Secretariat: (Trinidad and Tobago) Port-of-Spain
- Type: Regional organization
- Membership: 25 members; 10 associate members; 28 observers

Leaders
  - Secretary General: Ambassador Noemí Espinoza Madrid
  - Ministerial Council Chair: Panama
- Establishment: July 24, 1994
- Website http://www.acs-aec.org/

The Association of Caribbean States (ACS; Spanish: Asociación de Estados del Caribe; French: Association des États de la Caraïbe) is an advisory association of nations centered on the Caribbean Basin. It was formed with the aim of promoting consultation, cooperation, and concerted action among all the countries of the Caribbean coastal area. The five main purposes of the ACS are to promote greater trade between the nations, enhance transportation, develop sustainable tourism, facilitate greater and more effective responses to local natural disasters, and to preserve and conserve the Caribbean Sea.

It has twenty-five member states and seven associate members. The convention establishing the ACS was signed on July 24, 1994, in Cartagena, Colombia and is deposited with the Government of Colombia in English, French and Spanish languages. In the convention the founding observers were declared as the CARICOM Secretariat, the Latin American Economic System, the Central American Integration System, and the Permanent Secretariat of the General Agreement on Central American Economic Integration.

== ACS objectives and goals ==
A clickable Euler diagram showing the relationships between various multinational organizations in the Americas

The Association of Caribbean States is intended to promote regionalism among the member states. The success and functionality of the ACS is greatly debated among scholars. The main goals of the association are "to confirm the new concept of the Caribbean Basin by (A) accentuating those interests the Caribbean nations hold in common and (B) working to eliminate barriers left over from its colonial past."

The organization seeks to use geographic proximity and regional cooperation (regionalism) for political and economic advantage with respect to the global economy and trade blocs such as the North American Free Trade Agreement (NAFTA), European Union, Arab League, and the South Asian Association for Regional Cooperation. The ACS has four distinct areas of interest: Trade, Transport, Sustainable Tourism, and Natural Disasters. Each is pursued by a Special Committee which meets at least twice yearly in order to discuss current regional issues and draft treaties.

- The Special Committee on Trade Development and External Economic Relations works in an effort to create larger economic actions in the Caribbean by uniting its member states through integration and cooperation. Through various annual forums the ACS attempts to create economic cooperation in an attempt to benefit and expand the region's economy.
- The Special Committee on Transport works to promote an Air Transport Agreement amongst the countries which have ratified the agreement. Security of travelers and the policing of airborne crime like drug trafficking also falls under the auspices of the Special Committee on Transport.
- The Special Committee on Sustainable Tourism aims to promote tourism which is environmentally friendly. The committee promotes the use of sustainable tourism which is healthy for the environment, and at the same time economically beneficial to the Caribbean as a region.
- The Special Committee on Disaster Risk Reduction which aims to coordinate the prevention and response to natural disasters in the Caribbean. The main focus of this committee is to maintain organisation and attempt to maintain a high level of ability to cope with disasters.

Additionally there is a Council of National Representatives of the Special Fund that is in charge of overseeing the resource mobilization and project development of the Association.

=== Caribbean Sea agenda ===
One agenda adopted by the ACS has been an attempt to secure the designation of the Caribbean Sea as a special zone in the context of sustainable development, it is pushing for the UN to consider the Caribbean Sea as an invaluable asset that is worth protecting and treasuring. The organisation has sought to form a coalition among member states to devise a United Nations General Assembly resolution to ban the transshipment of nuclear materials through the Caribbean Sea and the Panama Canal.

=== VERB programme ===
VERB (Value, Empowerment, Resources, Betterment) programme aimed by ACS for empowering Caribbean peoples in all sectors (agriculture, education, fishery, etc.) with better resources and betterment of infrastructures in Caribbean by prioritising ecological and community welfare values and using renewable natural resources.

== Performance evaluation ==
The success of the ACS is debated by many scholars on both sides. Those who suggest the ACS is successful would point to the many initiatives the developmental coalition has undertaken, as well as its large membership and relations with other international organisations like the European Union. Those who suggest it is unsuccessful note how by the end of the 1990s, unlike CARICOM, the ACS had failed to establish a track record which was worthy enough to allow for the evaluation of the ACS as a developmental coalition. Furthermore, some scholars suggest that the ACS is unlikely to become a true player on the international level. Skeptics often point to other failed attempts at economic coalition building like the Central American Common Market (CACM) as an example of the instability of the region. The influence of NAFTA on the Caribbean outlines the future struggle of the ACS. The future of the ACS in relation to the Western Hemisphere is uncertain. "Despite governmental statements of commitment to liberalisation, it will be difficult for Caribbean countries to succeed in putting their economies on a firmer footing that would enable them to compete effectively."

== Summits ==
The summits held by the ACS are the most important meetings, and are attended by the Heads of State or Government of all the member countries, observer countries, social actors, and observer organizations. These meetings are where they will reaffirm and recommit to the organizations goals, objectives, and plans of action. The summit is a time for careful examination of issues faced by the region and to bring collaborative action towards the issues. The so called highlight of the summit is the adoption and signing of the Declaration, where leaders reaffirm and instruct the successful implementation of the proposed policies and actions that are outlined in the Declaration.

The ACS has held nine summits:

- I ACS Summit, at Port of Spain, Trinidad and Tobago, August 17–18, 1995.
- II ACS Summit, at Santo Domingo, Dominican Republic, April 16–17, 1999.
- III ACS Summit, at Isla Margarita, Venezuela, December 12, 2001.
- IV ACS Summit, at Panama City, Panama, July 29, 2005.
- V ACS Summit, at Pétion-Ville, Haiti, April 23–26, 2013.
- VI ACS Summit, at Mérida, Mexico, April 28–30, 2014.
- VII ACS Summit, at Havana, Cuba, June 4, 2016.
- VIII ACS Summit, at Managua, Nicaragua, March 29, 2019.
- IX ACS Summit, at Antigua Guatemala, Guatemala, May 8–12, 2023.

== Membership ==
=== Member states ===
- Antigua and Barbuda
- Bahamas
- Barbados
- Belize
- Colombia
- Costa Rica
- Cuba
- Dominica
- Dominican Republic
- El Salvador
- Grenada
- Guatemala
- Guyana
- Haiti
- Honduras
- Jamaica
- Mexico
- Nicaragua
- Panama
- Saint Kitts and Nevis
- Saint Lucia
- Saint Vincent and the Grenadines
- Suriname
- Trinidad and Tobago
- Venezuela

=== Associate member states ===
- Aruba
- British Virgin Islands
- Curaçao
- France on behalf of:
  - French Guiana
  - Saint Barthélemy
- Guadeloupe
- Martinique
- Montserrat
- Saint Martin
- Netherlands on behalf of:
  - Bonaire
  - Saba
  - Sint Eustatius
- Sint Maarten

=== Observer states ===
- Argentina
- Belarus
- Bolivia
- Brazil
- Canada
- Chile
- Ecuador
- Egypt
- Finland
- India
- Italy
- Japan
- Kazakhstan
- South Korea
- Morocco
- Netherlands
- Palestine
- Peru
- Russia
- Saudi Arabia
- Serbia
- Slovenia
- Spain
- Turkey
- Ukraine
- United Arab Emirates
- United Kingdom
- Uruguay

=== Observer organisations ===
- The Bolivarian Alliance for the Peoples of Our America - People's Trade Treaty
- Central American Bank for Economic Integration
- Arab League
- European Union
- Group of 77
- International Organization for Migration
- Organisation for Economic Co-operation and Development
- Pacific Islands Forum
- United Nations

=== Social Actors ===
- Caribbean Medical Association
- Regional Coordination for Economic and Social Research
- Caribbean Shipping Association
- Caribbean Association of Industry and Commerce
- CCA
- ACURIL
- Association of Caribbean Universities and Research Institutes
- The Antilles-French Guiana Regional Centre of the National Institute of Agronomical Research
- Latin American Faculty of Social Science

== Relationship with other supranational organisations ==
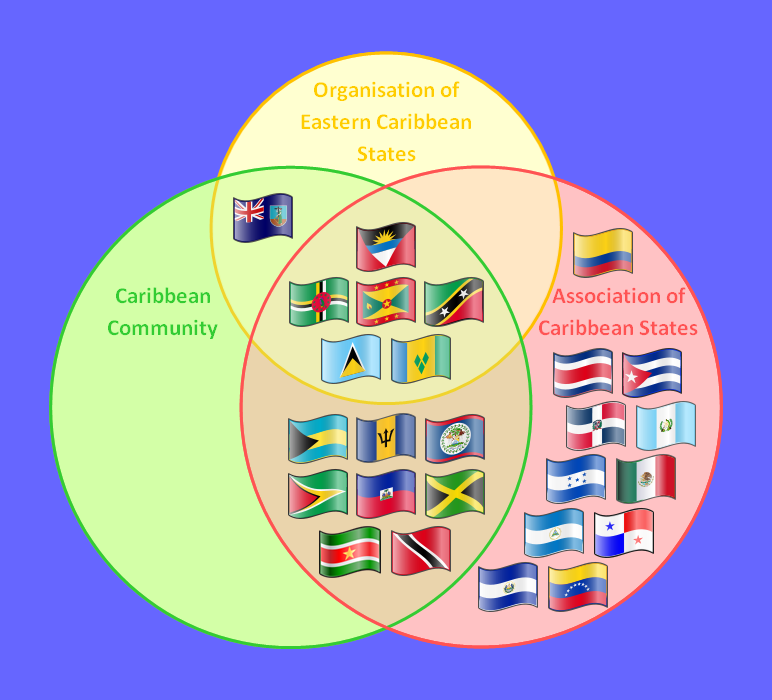
A clickable Euler diagram showing the relationships between various Supranational Caribbean Organisations and agreements

=== Observer organisations ===
- Caribbean Community (CARICOM) Secretariat
- Caribbean Tourism Organization (CTO)
- Central American Integration System (SICA)
- General Agreement on Central American Economic Integration (SIECA) Permanent Secretariat
- Community of Latin American and Caribbean States
- European Union
- Latin American Economic System (SELA)
- MERCOSUR
- United Nations Economic Commission for Latin America and the Caribbean (ECLAC)
- Organization of American States (OAS)
- Organisation for Economic Co-operation and Development (OECD)

== See also ==
- Economy of Latin America / the Caribbean
- List of regional organizations by population
- List of countries by credit rating
- List of countries by public debt
- List of countries by tax revenue as percentage of GDP
- List of countries by future gross government debt
- List of countries by leading trade partners
- List of Latin American and Caribbean countries by GDP growth
- List of Latin American and Caribbean countries by GDP (nominal)
- List of Latin American and Caribbean countries by GDP (PPP)
- East Caribbean dollar
- Sucre (currency)
- International status and usage of the euro
- Internationalization of the renminbi
- International use of the U.S. dollar
- Central banks and currencies of the Caribbean
- Caribbean Development Bank
