= List of population related meta concepts and meta lists =

Outline of demography contains human demography and population related important concepts and high-level aggregated lists compiled in the useful categories.

The subheadings have been grouped by the following 4 categories:

1. Meta (lit. "highest" level) units, such as the universal important concepts related to demographics and places.
2. Macro (lit. "high" level) units where the "whole world" is the smallest unit of measurement, such as the aggregated summary demographics at global level. For example, United Nations.
3. Meso (lit. "middle" or "intermediate" level) units where the smallest unit of measurement cover more than one nation and more than one continent but not all the nations or continents. For example, summary list at continental level, e.g. Eurasia and Latin America or Middle East which cover two or more continents. Other examples include the intercontinental organisations e.g. the Commonwealth of Nations or the organisation of Arab states.
4. Micro (lit. "lower" or "smaller") level units where country is the smallest unit of measurement, such as the "globally aggregated lists" by the "individual countries" .

Please do not add sections on the items that are the nano (lit. "minor" or "tiny") level units as per the context described above, e.g. list of things within a city must be kept out.

== Meta or important concepts ==
=== Global human population ===
- World population
- Demographics of the world
- Fertility and intelligence
- Human geography
- Geographic mobility
- Globalization
- Human migration
- List of lists on linguistics

=== Impact of human population ===
- Human impact on the environment
- Biological dispersal
- Carrying capacity
- Doomsday argument
- Environmental migrant
- Human overpopulation
- Malthusian catastrophe
- List of countries by carbon dioxide emissions
- List of countries by carbon dioxide emissions per capita
- List of countries by greenhouse gas emissions
- List of countries by greenhouse gas emissions per capita
- Overconsumption
- Overexploitation
- Population ecology

=== Continuation of human species ===
==== Sustainable and secure optimum human population ====
- Birth control
- Family planning
- Human population planning
- Human security
- Ideal free distribution
- Survivability
- Survivorship curve

==== Sustainable food security ====
- Food security
- Geography of food
- Nutritional economics
- Sustainable agriculture

==== Sustainability ====
- Climate change
- Environmental Sustainability
- List of climate scientists
- List of global sustainability statistics
- List of renewable energy topics by country and territory
- List of environmental academic degrees
- List of sustainability programs in North America
- Voluntary Human Extinction Movement

== Macro or highest level global lists ==
These are macro (high or top) level lists.

=== Global lists of historical populations ===
- Historical demography
- Population reconstruction
- List of largest empires
- List of richest nations throughout history
- List of largest historical cities by chronology

=== World summary lists ===
- World population
- List of continents by population
- List of regional organizations by population
- List of religious populations
- List of unrecognized countries
- List of micronations
- List of lists of countries by population

== Meso or intermediate level sub-global lists ==
These meso (middle or intermediate) level lists are

- "supra-national" (more than one continent "and" more than one nation), but
- "sub-global" (but not all nations "or" all continents).

=== Intercontinental lists ===
This is aggregated list of demographics and places spanning across more than one continent but not across all the nations.

- Americas
- Arab states
- Commonwealth of Nations
- Eurasia
- Latin America
- Middle East

=== Summary lists aggregated by continents ===
This is aggregated list by individual subcontinent.

==== Asia ====
This is aggregated list of Asia subcontinent.

- List of Asian countries by population
- Population density of Asian countries
- List of urban agglomerations in Asia
- List of metropolitan areas in Asia

==== Africa ====
This is aggregated list of Africa subcontinent.

- List of African countries by population
- List of African countries by population density

==== Europe ====
This is aggregated list of Europe subcontinent.

- List of European countries by population and area
- List of the European Union members by density

==== North America ====
This is aggregated list of North America subcontinent.

- List of North American countries by population
- List of sovereign states and dependent territories in North America by population density

==== South America ====
This is aggregated list of South America subcontinent.

- List of South American countries by population
- List of sovereign states and dependent territories in South America by population density

==== Oceania ====
This is aggregated list of Oceania as subcontinent.

- List of Oceanian countries by population
- Population density of countries in Oceania

== Micro or lower level global lists ==
=== Global lists aggregated by countries ===
This is "aggregated global" list by countries. Do not put the list of individual countries in his section.

- List of list of countries and regions
- Lists of countries by GDP
- List of countries by population
- List of countries by population (United Nations)
- List of countries by past and future population
- List of countries by population density
- List of countries by arable land density
- List of countries by population growth rate
- List of countries by fertility rate
- List of countries by median age
- List of countries by refugee population

=== Global lists aggregated by subdivisions of countries ===
This is aggregated "global" list of subdivisions by countries.

- List of the largest country subdivisions by area
- Lists of political and geographic subdivisions by total area

=== Global lists aggregated by urban areas of countries ===
This is aggregated "global" list of urban areas by countries.

- Urbanization
- Transborder agglomeration
- List of countries by urban population
- List of largest cities by population
- List of largest cities by density
- List of divided cities
- Lists of list of cities
- Lists of list of places
- Lists of list of Settlements

== Lists of individual countries ==
This is list is related only to individual countries, i.e. create separate subsection for each country. Please help expand this incomplete list by adding more nations.

=== Bangladesh ===
- Demographics of Bangladesh.
- List of cities and towns in Bangladesh by population
- List of villages in Bangladesh

=== Brazil ===
- Demographics of Brazil
- List of Brazilian states by area
- List of Brazilian states by murder rate
- List of cities in Brazil by population
- List of Brazilian states by population

=== China ===
- Demographics of China
- List of Chinese administrative divisions by population
- List of cities in China by population

=== India ===
- Demographics of India
- List of cities in India by population
- List of million-plus agglomerations in India
- List of metropolitan areas in India
- List of states and union territories of India by population

=== Indonesia ===
- Demographics of Indonesia
- Provinces of Indonesia
- List of Indonesian cities by population
- List of Indonesian islands by population

=== Pakistan ===
- Demographic history of Pakistan
- Demographics of Pakistan
- List of cities in Pakistan by population
- Ethnic groups in Pakistan

=== Russia ===
- Demographics of Russia
- List of cities and towns in Russia by population
- List of federal subjects of Russia by population

=== USA ===
- Demographics of United States
- List of states and territories of the United States by population

== See also ==
- List of lists of lists
- List of lists
