= Cayman Islands Monetary Authority =

Central Bank of Cayman Islands

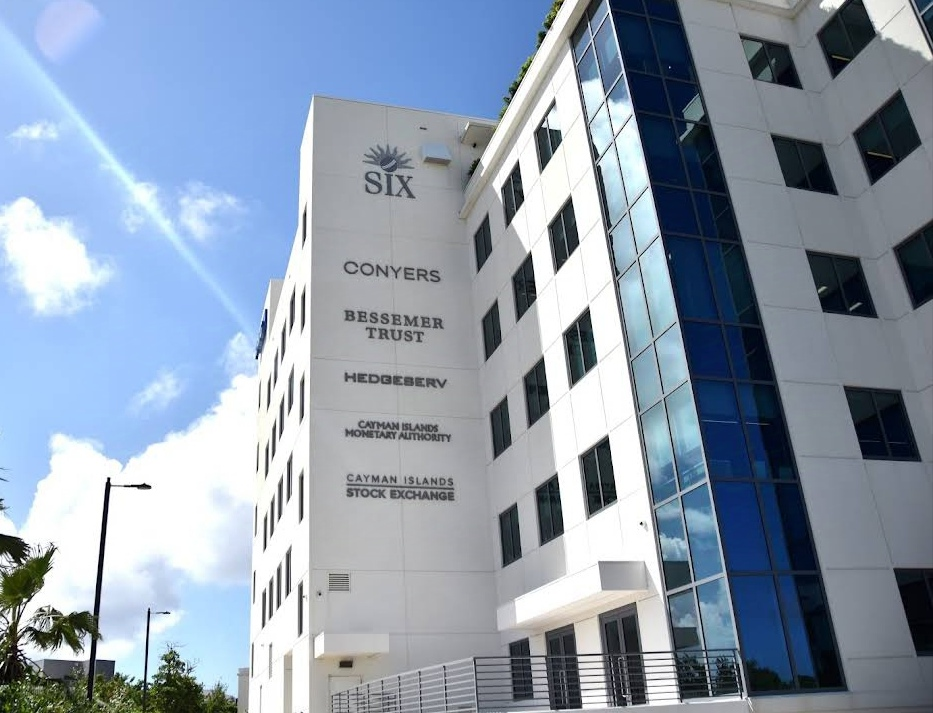
- Headquarters: Grand Cayman, Cayman Islands
- Established: January 1, 1997
- Chairman: Grant Stein
- Central bank of: Cayman Islands
- Currency: Cayman Islands dollar KYD (ISO 4217)
- Website: www.cima.ky

The Cayman Islands Monetary Authority (CIMA) is the primary financial services regulator of the Cayman Islands and supervises its currency board.

The CIMA manages the Cayman Islands currency, regulates and supervises financial services, provides assistance to overseas regulatory authorities and advises the Cayman Islands government on financial-services regulatory matters.

It is a corporation created pursuant to the Cayman Islands Monetary Authority Law (2013 Revision).

== History ==
The Monetary Authority replaced the Cayman Islands Currency Board, which was established by the Currency Law of 1971 and started operations on 1 May 1972. The Currency Board allowed the Cayman Islands to have their own currency, with the Cayman Islands dollar replacing the Jamaican dollar that had been previously in use. The Currency Board was reorganized as CIMA in 1996.

== Regulatory framework ==
- Banks and lenders
- Offshore banks
- Funds and segregated portfolio companies
- Payment processing services
- Credit unions

== See also ==
- Cayman Islands dollar
- Economy of the Cayman Islands
- Central banks and currencies of the Caribbean
- Currencies of the British West Indies
- Securities Commission
- List of central banks
- List of financial supervisory authorities by country
