= Central banks and currencies of the Caribbean =

List of the central banks and currencies of the Caribbean

This is a list of the central banks and currencies of the Caribbean.

There are a number of currencies serving multiple territories; the most widespread are the East Caribbean dollar (8 countries and territories), the United States dollar (5) and the euro (4).

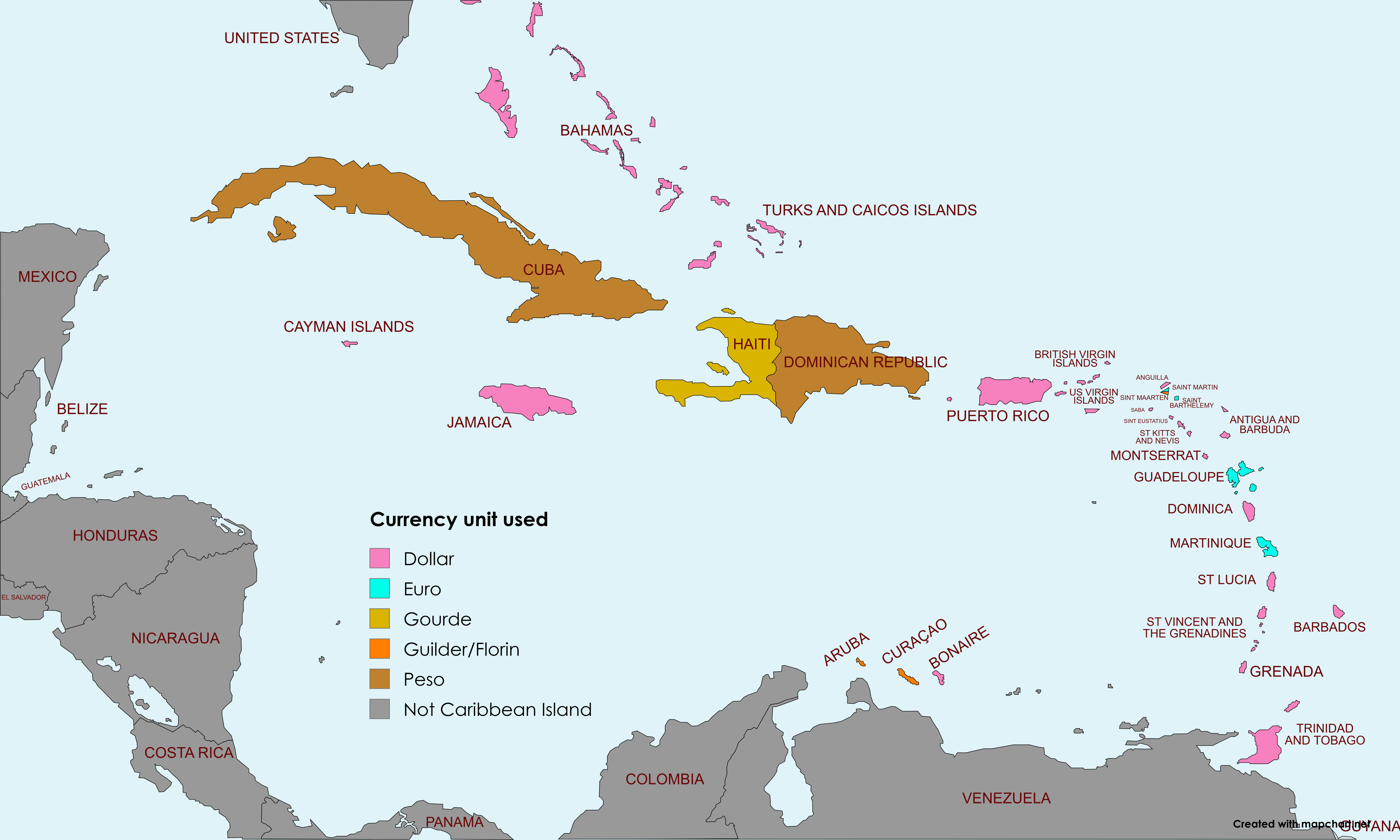
Currency unit used in the Caribbean.

Country/territory	Currency	ISO 4217 Code	Central bank	Peg
Aruba	Aruban Florin	AWG	Central Bank of Aruba	1.79 AWG = 1.00 USD
Bahamas	Bahamian Dollar	BSD	Central Bank of The Bahamas	1.00 BSD = 1.00 USD
Barbados	Barbadian Dollar	BBD	Central Bank of Barbados	2.00 BBD = 1.00 USD
Cayman Islands	Cayman Islands Dollar	KYD	Cayman Islands Monetary Authority	1.00 KYD = 1.20 USD
Cuba	Cuban Peso	CUP	Central Bank of Cuba	float
Dominican Republic	Dominican Peso	DOP	Banco Central de la República Dominicana	float
Haiti	Haitian Gourde	HTG	Banque de la République d'Haïti	float
Jamaica	Jamaican Dollar	JMD	Bank of Jamaica	float
Trinidad and Tobago	Trinidad and Tobago Dollar	TTD	Central Bank of Trinidad and Tobago	float
Anguilla	East Caribbean Dollar	XCD	Eastern Caribbean Central Bank	2.70 XCD = 1.00 USD
Antigua and Barbuda	East Caribbean Dollar	XCD	Eastern Caribbean Central Bank	2.70 XCD = 1.00 USD
Dominica	East Caribbean Dollar	XCD	Eastern Caribbean Central Bank	2.70 XCD = 1.00 USD
Grenada	East Caribbean Dollar	XCD	Eastern Caribbean Central Bank	2.70 XCD = 1.00 USD
Montserrat	East Caribbean Dollar	XCD	Eastern Caribbean Central Bank	2.70 XCD = 1.00 USD
Saint Kitts and Nevis	East Caribbean Dollar	XCD	Eastern Caribbean Central Bank	2.70 XCD = 1.00 USD
Saint Lucia	East Caribbean Dollar	XCD	Eastern Caribbean Central Bank	2.70 XCD = 1.00 USD
Saint Vincent and the Grenadines	East Caribbean Dollar	XCD	Eastern Caribbean Central Bank	2.70 XCD = 1.00 USD
Curaçao	Caribbean Guilder	XCG	Central Bank of Curaçao and Sint Maarten	1.79 XCG = 1.00 USD
Sint Maarten	Caribbean Guilder	XCG	Central Bank of Curaçao and Sint Maarten	1.79 XCG = 1.00 USD
Guadeloupe	Euro	EUR	European Central Bank	float
Martinique	Euro	EUR	European Central Bank	float
Saint Barthélemy	Euro	EUR	European Central Bank	float
Saint Martin	Euro	EUR	European Central Bank	float
British Virgin Islands	United States dollar	USD	Federal Reserve Bank	float
Bonaire	United States dollar	USD	Federal Reserve Bank	float
Puerto Rico	United States dollar	USD	Federal Reserve Bank	float
Saba	United States dollar	USD	Federal Reserve Bank	float
Sint Eustatius	United States dollar	USD	Federal Reserve Bank	float
Turks and Caicos Islands	United States dollar	USD	Federal Reserve Bank	float
United States Virgin Islands	United States dollar	USD	Federal Reserve Bank	float

Surrounding countries and territories

Country/territory	Currency	Code	Central bank	Peg
Bermuda	Bermudian dollar	BMD	Bermuda Monetary Authority	1.00 BMD = 1.00 USD
United States	United States dollar	USD	Federal Reserve Bank	float
Mexico	Mexican peso	MXN	Bank of Mexico	float
Belize	Belize dollar	BZD	Central Bank of Belize	2.00 BZD = 1.00 USD
Guatemala	Guatemalan quetzal	GTQ	Bank of Guatemala	float
Honduras	Honduran lempira	HNL	Central Bank of Honduras	crawling peg to USD
Nicaragua	Nicaraguan córdoba	NIO	Central Bank of Nicaragua	crawling peg to USD
Costa Rica	Costa Rican colón	CRC	Central Bank of Costa Rica	float
Panama	US dollar / Panamanian balboa	USD / PAB	Federal Reserve Bank / National Bank of Panama	1.00 PAB = 1.00 USD
Colombia	Colombian peso	COP	Banco de la República	float
Venezuela	Venezuelan bolívar	VED	Banco Central de Venezuela	other
Guyana	Guyanese dollar	GYD	Bank of Guyana	float
Suriname	Surinamese dollar	SRD	Central Bank of Suriname	float
French Guiana	Euro	EUR	European Central Bank	float

== See also ==
- List of banks
- Economy of the Caribbean
- Currencies of the British West Indies
- International status and usage of the euro
- Pan-African Payment and Settlement System
- List of countries by leading trade partners
- List of Latin American and Caribbean countries by GDP growth
- List of Latin American and Caribbean countries by GDP (nominal)
- List of Latin American and Caribbean countries by GDP (PPP)
- United Nations Economic Commission for Latin America and the Caribbean (ECLAC)
