= Cayman Islands Department of Commerce & Investment =

Government investment initiative

The Cayman Islands Department of Commerce & Investment, formerly known as the Cayman Islands Investment Bureau (until 2010), is a government agency that was established to promote investment in the Cayman Islands. The department offers several free services to foreign investors seeking to establish a business in the Cayman Islands. The Investment Bureau also provides assistance to local small businesses, particularly through free workshops and seminars on issues of interest to entrepreneurs.

== See also ==
- Economy of the Cayman Islands
