= Cayman Enterprise City =

Development project in the Cayman Islands

Cayman Enterprise City is a development project which consists of three special economic zones focused on attracting knowledge-based and specialized-services businesses to set up a physical presence in the Cayman Islands. It is a government initiative that has been outsourced to Cayman Enterprise City, a privately owned development company. To facilitate the development of special economic zones in the Cayman Islands, special economic zones laws were enacted in September 2011 and February 2012. The government established the Special Economic Zone Authority ("SEZA") as the licensing and regulatory body.

== Background ==
The Cayman Islands is an international finance center and tourist destination, and Cayman Enterprise City was developed to expand and diversify the economy by attracting new knowledge-based industries to the islands. A further objective was to create new technology-focused careers and to transfer knowledge to locals. Cayman Enterprise City has strategic partnerships with the Cayman Islands Government, The National Workforce Development Agency, and the University College of the Cayman Islands.

== Economic impact ==
A 2020 economic impact report has put the special economic zone’s economic impact during the first 10 years of its operation at US$502 million. Cayman Enterprise City has been able to innovate and diversify its economic base, providing companies to work with and engage in emerging Tech sectors adding new skills and jobs to the Caymanian workforce. Aside from the direct impact, over 100 local vendors provide services and supplies to CEC’s special economic zones and thereby create economic activity and employment in adjacent and complementary local industries. In 2020, just under 15% of jobs at special economic zone companies were filled by Caymanians. The employment of expats, in turn, meant more local spending and consumption, the report said.

In September 2018, its 250th company came on board, and targets to have 500 sponsored companies here within the next five years, directly impacting the economy. To date, Enterprise City’s contribution to the local economy has been US$155 million from 2012 to the end of 2017.

It has been reported that the economic impact of Cayman Enterprise City in the Cayman Islands was US$41.56 million in 2017.

== Awards ==
In 2020, Cayman Enterprise City was awarded the Freezone of the Year, Americas Award for the third year in a row and ranked 5th globally. CEC was also commended for Data Protection, Events Organised and Facilities Upgrades by fDi magazine.

== Benefits ==
The zones offer a number of benefits to companies located within, including several concessions and special treatment by Government:

- 100% Exempt from corporate tax
- 100% Exempt from income tax
- 100% Exempt from sales tax
- 100% Exempt from capital gains tax
- 4-6 week fast-track set up of operations
- Renewable 5-year work/residency visas granted for staff from any country, within 5 working days
- 100% Exempt from import duties

== Special Economic Zones ==
Cayman Enterprise City consists of three special economic zones; Cayman Tech City, Commodities & Derivatives City, and Maritime & Aviation City. Since its launch in February 2012, the Cayman Enterprise City special economic zones have attracted over 250 companies to set up a physical office presence within the three zones.

== Campus Development ==
Companies are currently located in four interim commercial buildings located around George Town, the capital of Grand Cayman, while a new master campus is being developed. The new purpose-built campus will encompass approximately 53-acres. The first phase of the Cayman Enterprise City campus was approved by the Central Planning Authority in April 2018 and broke ground in November 2018. Construction on the first building began January 2019 with the second building starting in 2020. A target date for the grand opening will be held for the first building in 2022, which will serve as the “campus hub.” New Cayman Enterprise City companies will move into the first building, and established companies that are currently located in other areas of Cayman will move into the second building. The master plan consists of office buildings, residential areas, restaurants and amenities. Additional features include rooftop greeneries, solar panels, a water-harvesting system, and slick bottom walls to make the buildings “iguana-proof".
