= List of Latin American and Caribbean countries by GDP growth =

This is a list of estimates of the real gross domestic product growth rate (not rebased GDP) in Latin American and the Caribbean nations for the latest years recorded in the CIA World Factbook. The list contains some non-sovereign territories.

== List ==
Real GDP growth rates of Latin American and the Caribbean nations
Rank	Nation	GDP growth rate (%)	Year
1	Guyana	33.8	2023 est.
2	Panama	7.4	2023 est.
3	Saint Vincent and the Grenadines	6.0	2023 est.
4	Costa Rica	5.1	2023 est.
5	Saint Martin	4.9	2023 est.
6	Paraguay	4.7	2023 est.
6	Dominica	4.7	2023 est.
8	Nicaragua	4.6	2023 est.
9	Cayman Islands (Note: The Cayman Islands is an overseas territory of the United Kingdom.)	4.4	2023 est.
10	Aruba (Note: Aruba is a constituent country of the Kingdom of The Netherlands.)	4.3	2023 est.
11	Curacao (Note: Curacao is a constituent country of the Kingdom of The Netherlands.)	4.2	2023 est.
12	Barbados	4.1	2023 est.
13	Antigua and Barbuda	3.9	2023 est.
14	Sint Maarten (Note: Sint Maarten is a constituent country of the Kingdom of The Netherlands.)	3.8	2023 est.
15	Honduras	3.6	2023 est.
15	Grenada	3.6	2023 est.
17	Guatemala	3.5	2023 est.
17	El Salvador	3.5	2023 est.
19	Mexico	3.2	2023 est.
20	Bolivia	3.1	2023 est.
21	Brazil	2.9	2023 est.
22	Bahamas	2.7	2023 est.
23	Suriname	2.5	2023 est.
24	Ecuador	2.4	2023 est.
24	Dominican Republic	2.4	2023 est.
26	Saint Kitts and Nevis	2.3	2023 est.
27	Saint Lucia	2.2	2023 est.
27	Jamaica	2.2	2023 est.
29	British Virgin Islands (Note: The British Virgin Islands is an overseas territory of the United Kingdom.)	2.0	2023 est.
30	Trinidad and Tobago	1.4	2023 est.
31	Turks and Caicos Islands	1.2	2023 est.
31	Belize	1.2	2023 est.
33	Colombia	0.6	2023 est.
33	Puerto Rico (Note: Puerto Rico is an unincorporated territory of the United States.)	0.6	2023 est.
35	Uruguay	0.4	2023 est.
36	Chile	0.2	2023 est.
37	Peru	-0.6	2023 est.
38	US Virgin Islands (Note: US Virgin Islands is an unincorporated territory of the United States.)	–1.3	2022 est.
38	Argentina	-1.6	2023 est.
40	Haiti	–1.9	2023 est.
40	Cuba	–1.9	2023 est.
42	Venezuela	–19.7	2018 est.

== See also ==
- Community of Latin American and Caribbean States
- List of countries by Human Development Index
- List of countries by industrial production growth rate
- List of countries by percentage of population living in poverty
- List of countries by real GDP growth rate
- List of Latin American and Caribbean countries by GDP (nominal)
- List of Latin American and Caribbean countries by GDP (PPP)
- List of Latin American countries by population
