= Special economic zone =

Region with specialized business and trade laws

A special economic zone (SEZ) is an area in which the business and trade laws are different from the rest of the country. SEZs are located within a country's national borders, and their aims include increasing trade balance, employment, increased investment, job creation and effective administration. To encourage businesses to set up in the zone, financial policies are introduced. These policies typically encompass investing, taxation, trading, quotas, customs and labour regulations. Additionally, companies may be offered tax holidays, where upon establishing themselves in a zone, they are granted a period of lower taxation.

The creation of special economic zones by the host country may be motivated by the desire to attract foreign direct investment (FDI). The benefits a company gains by being in a special economic zone may mean that it can produce and trade goods at a lower price, aimed at being globally competitive. In some countries, the zones have been criticized for being little more than labor camps, with workers denied fundamental labor rights. In some areas, especially Southeast Asia, some SEZs have been repurposed to house illicit activities, including illegal online gambling and cyber-enabled fraud (see for example Golden Triangle Special Economic Zone).

== Definition ==
The definition of an SEZ is determined individually by each country. According to the World Bank in 2008, the modern-day special economic zone typically includes a "geographically limited area, usually physically secured (fenced-in); single management or administration; eligibility for benefits based upon physical location within the zone; separate customs area (duty-free benefits) and streamlined procedures."

However, even though some countries proceed differently with these SEZs, these zones are typically created to attract foreign investment, promote industrialization, and become or serve as grounds for more economic reforms.

== History ==
The United States has long applied special economic rules to its outlying territories for the purpose of economic development. Section 936 corporate tax exemptions for Puerto Rico began with Operation Bootstrap in the 1940s and ended in 2006. The federal minimum wage for U.S. territories has in the past been lower than in the states, and as of 2024, American Samoa is still adjusting upward to the nationwide minimum.

Modern SEZs appeared from the late-1950s in industrial countries. The first was the Shannon Free Zone in Shannon Airport, located in County Clare, Ireland. Some tax-free jurisdictions such as the Cayman Islands offer technology companies a way to keep their IP offshore in a Special Economic Zone (see Cayman Enterprise City).

From the 1970s onward, zones providing labour-intensive manufacturing have been established, starting in Latin America and East Asia. The first in China, following the Chinese economic reform, was the Shenzhen Special Economic Zone. This zone essentially transformed what was a small fishing village into a giant global manufacturing and production hub within a couple of decades. This showed the effectiveness of SEZs as an engine of economic growth and served as the model for other zones in China. Continuing on, the Shenzhen Special Economic Zone encouraged foreign investment and simultaneously accelerated industrialization in this region. These zones attracted investment from multinational corporations and allowed export-oriented Chinese businesses to respond quickly to demand in foreign markets. China continues to maintain Special Economic Zones and certain open coastal areas. Most of China's SEZs are located in former treaty ports and therefore have symbolic significance in demonstrating a "reversal of fortunes" in China's dealings with foreigners since the century of humiliation. Researcher Zongyuan Zoe Liu writes that "[t]he success of these cities as 'red' treaty ports represented another step in China's overall reform and opening-up plan while legitimizing the leadership of the CPC over the Chinese state and people."

Vietnam established 18 coastal economic zones as part of its industrialization process. These included incentives to attract foreign direct investment as well as major investment in worker education and training.

Numerous African countries have set up SEZs in connection with China, including over the period 1990 to 2018 establishing SEZs in Nigeria (two), Zambia, Djibouti, Kenya, Mauritius, Mauritania, Egypt, and Algeria. Generally, the Chinese government takes a hands-off approach, leaving it to Chinese enterprises to work to establish such zones (although it does provide support in the form of grants, loans, and subsidies, including support via the China Africa Development Fund). The Forum on China-Africa Cooperation promotes these SEZs heavily.

As of at least 2024, there is a trend of southeast Asian countries to develop and increase their SEZs. Since 2015, Thailand developed ten SEZs. As of 2024, Indonesia has 13 SEZs, the Philippines has 12 SEZs, and Cambodia has 31 SEZs.

== Economic impacts ==
SEZs have a significant impact on the economies where they are established, offering several key benefits that contribute to economic growth and development. One of the most important effects is the attraction of Foreign Direct Investment (FDI). By offering tax breaks, streamlined regulations, and enhanced infrastructure, SEZs provide a favorable environment for foreign companies looking to invest. This influx of capital can generate substantial economic activity, including job creation within the zones and in related sectors such as logistics, transportation, and services.

SEZ's can lead to growth in Gross Regional Product (GRP) per capita, reflecting an increase in the economic output of the region. Similarly, they can contribute to higher personal income levels and attract more FDI projects, which bring in both capital and expertise. These economic improvements can contribute to higher living standards for the local population.

In addition to attracting investment, SEZs are crucial for generating employment. The businesses that establish themselves in these zones require workers, leading to an increase in jobs for the local population. This can, in turn, result in higher income levels and better living standards for people in the surrounding areas. However, the positive economic effects of SEZs do not always translate into positive social impacts. For instance, despite the economic growth they bring, SEZs may not always lead to a significant reduction in unemployment rates, as some regions may experience a mismatch between job creation and local labor market needs.

SEZs also play a vital role in boosting exports. Many companies operating in these zones focus on manufacturing goods for international markets, helping to increase a country's exports, which can improve the trade balance and generate foreign exchange earnings.

Furthermore, SEZs contribute to local economic development by stimulating demand for local goods and services. As businesses in the zones require input from local suppliers, this creates additional economic activity and encourages further investments in the region. Infrastructure development is another major benefit. The establishment of SEZs often leads to improvements in transportation networks, utilities, and communication systems, which can have positive effects beyond the zone itself, benefiting the wider economy. Additionally, SEZs can serve as hubs for technology transfer and innovation. Foreign companies often bring advanced technologies and expertise, which can help local firms improve their own operations and boost their competitiveness. This knowledge transfer is essential for skill development within the local workforce, enhancing their capabilities and preparing them for future economic challenges.

However, SEZs also have some drawbacks, such as a possible increase in inequalities between regions or the potential for inefficient resource diversification. Indeed, the economic benefits of SEZs are unevenly distributed. Critics argue that these zones often benefit large multinational corporations disproportionately while providing limited gains for local businesses and communities. In Poland, for example, SEZs have concentrated economic activity in select regions, creating significant disparities in development. Moreover, the focus on foreign investors can result in dependency on external capital, which may not always align with the host country's long-term economic priorities. This is directly linked to the theory of a balanced economy, which claims that an economy can only grow if all sectors are financed simultaneously. In contrast, the unbalanced development theory argues that investing in certain sectors—or, in this context, specific regions—can lead to the development of other sectors.

Another drawback is the fact that tax incentives can disrupt the equilibrium between the state and companies. When companies make sufficient profits, they pay higher taxes, which allows the government to invest without raising taxes. However, if this is not the case, the government may need to increase taxes. In a tax incentive system, to maintain equilibrium, the revenue generated by the system must be high enough to prevent the state from having to raise taxes.

Finally, while SEZs are heralded for their ability to attract Foreign Direct Investment (FDI), their broader economic implications often reveal significant shortcomings. One major concern is their role in facilitating tax evasion. By offering highly competitive tax rates and other financial incentives, SEZs sometimes create conditions where corporations exploit loopholes to minimize their tax liabilities. This practice undermines state revenues, limiting the ability of governments to invest in public services and infrastructure. For instance, Ireland's Shannon SEZ, while successful in drawing foreign investment, has been criticized for perpetuating "tax haven" dynamics that weaken EU fiscal cohesion.

== SEZ location ==
The location of an SEZ and the availability of good infrastructure can determine whether an SEZ is productive. This includes access to transportation signals, energy supply, and forms of communication. All of which are essential to backing industrial activity and attracting foreign or domestic investment. Governments will usually establish SEZs in less-developed, decentralized areas to promote regional economic growth, employment, and reduce geographic economic inequalities. However, SEZs located near large cities tend to be more productive. This is especially true if the SEZs have access to efficient communication and transportation systems, such as proximity to a port or an airport.

Many zones are deliberately positioned near borders to facilitate cross-border trade by allowing businesses to leverage tariff advantages and access multiple markets efficiently. For instance, companies operating in border zones can easily source raw materials from neighboring countries or export finished goods to nearby markets.

Another important consideration is why firms choose SEZs inside or outside the EU. SEZs in the EU offer unparalleled access to the European market, political stability, and high production standards, which enhance the reputation of products. Additionally, the advanced infrastructure and strong emphasis on sustainability in EU SEZs attract firms focused on long-term investments. Conversely, SEZs in non-EU countries may appeal to businesses seeking lower labor costs, less stringent regulations, or tax incentives that might not comply with EU competition rules. For example, firms targeting high-growth emerging markets or wishing to bypass stricter EU regulations might opt for SEZs outside the EU.

== SEZ regulation in Europe ==
SEZs in Europe are often seen as "unlikely cases" because they operate under stricter regulations compared to other regions. Unlike zones in Asia or Africa, European SEZs must align with EU state aid rules and fair competition principles. This makes their model unique, as they prioritize high-value-added industries, green energy, and technology sectors over labor-intensive manufacturing. These characteristics underscore Europe's commitment to sustainable and knowledge-driven economic growth.

The regulatory framework governing SEZs in Europe operates at multiple levels, encompassing EU, national, and local jurisdictions.

Taxation within SEZs, however, falls under the purview of national governments. The EU lacks the authority to harmonize tax systems across member states, resulting in significant variations in SEZ tax policies. For instance, some countries offer aggressive tax incentives to attract Foreign Direct Investment (FDI), leading to a "race to the bottom" that exacerbates economic disparities between regions. National authorities independently design these fiscal policies, often prioritizing immediate investment inflows over long-term equitable development

== SEZ practical cases ==
=== Poland ===
In Poland, Special Economic Zones (SEZs) were established to attract foreign investment and promote economic development. The primary goal of creating SEZs in Poland was to reduce structural unemployment and boost the economy in the poorest regions of the country. The main fiscal instruments used to attract FDI include tax breaks on corporate, personal income, and real estate taxes. These tax incentives can be applied for a period of 10 to 15 years. The Polish government created 14 SEZs, with the first becoming operational in 1995. Its creation resulted in the establishment of 55,000 new jobs and a significant increase in FDI, particularly in the automotive sector, as it attracted major industry players like General Motors. These zones are characterized by several attractive features, including high-quality infrastructure, a skilled workforce, and various tax incentives such as tax exemptions on profits and property within specified limits.

As of the end of 2014, the SEZs employed approximately 250,000 workers, demonstrating a significant increase from previous years. The cumulative investment in these zones was estimated at $23.3 billion by 2012. The Polish SEZs are regarded as some of the most competitive in Central Europe, with consistent interest from investors, averaging around 100 new permits issued per year. This ongoing demand led the Polish government to extend the favorable regime associated with these zones for an additional six years. Each SEZ is managed by specific entities or agencies dedicated to their development (Structure and Management). Originally, the zones were set up for a period of twenty years, but this has since been extended to 2026. The Polish government has recognized the importance of these zones in maintaining a competitive edge in attracting investment.

The success of the Polish SEZs can be attributed to their strategic design and the incentives offered, which facilitate the establishment and operation of businesses, thereby contributing to regional economic growth and enhancing the overall investment climate in Poland.

SEZs in Poland are attractive to investors due to several factors:

- Quality Infrastructure: The zones are equipped with modern infrastructure that supports various industries, making them suitable locations for manufacturing and high-tech services.
- Skilled Workforce: There is a concentration of qualified workers in these areas, which is essential for businesses looking for specific expertise.
- Tax Incentives: Investors can benefit from significant tax exemptions, including exemptions on profits and property taxes within a certain limit. This financial incentive is a key factor in attracting both local and foreign companies.

=== Ireland ===
Ireland is often cited as a success story in the use of Special Economic Zones (SEZs) to attract foreign investment and stimulate economic growth, with the Shannon Free Zone as a notable example. Established in 1959, this zone is recognized as the first modern industrial free zone, designed to attract international capital into manufacturing and services, addressing the structural changes in air transport at the time. The Shannon Free Zone offered attractive tax conditions, including an exemption from taxes on export profits for 25 years and a highly competitive corporate tax rate. This strategy aimed to reduce bureaucracy and create a business-friendly environment, thus facilitating the establishment of foreign businesses in Europe.

The development of the zone was accompanied by modern infrastructure and integrated services, which allowed for improved operational efficiency for businesses. Industrial relations, characterized by an informal and cooperative approach, further strengthened this favorable environment. By 1968, the Shannon Free Zone employed nearly 4,000 people and played a key role in Ireland's exports, becoming a driver of economic growth. The Shannon Development agency continuously adjusted its strategy to ensure the competitiveness and sustainability of the zone, demonstrating its commitment to adapting to the needs of investors.

The Irish government also played a crucial role in the success of these zones, particularly through the Industrial Development Authority (IDA), which worked to position Ireland as an attractive destination for foreign investment. The Irish experience shows how targeted tax incentives, robust infrastructure, and a business-friendly environment can transform a country into a leading player in attracting foreign direct investment.

=== Italy ===
The case of Special Economic Zones (SEZs) in Italy is illustrated by the establishment of the SEZ in the Campania region, which marked the country's first such initiative. This SEZ was introduced through Legislative Decree No 91 on June 20, 2017, and became operational in 2018. Its main objective is to foster economic growth in the region by offering fiscal and administrative advantages to businesses operating within its defined areas. The Campania SEZ spans 37 municipalities out of the 550 in the region, covering a total area of 5,154 hectares. These zones were selected based on their strategic location near ports and transport hubs, aiming to enhance accessibility to logistical and industrial networks. The design of the SEZ focuses on improving infrastructure, especially to facilitate the movement of goods through road, rail, sea, and air transport.

One of the main features of the Campania SEZ is the array of benefits it offers to companies. Businesses within these zones enjoy various incentives, including exemptions from specific regulations and streamlined procedures for obtaining permits related to environmental, construction, and port operations. Tax credits are available, with higher benefits for larger enterprises and those in areas affected by natural disasters.

The key advantages for companies investing in the SEZs in Southern Italy include:

- Fiscal and Administrative Benefits: Companies operating within SEZs can benefit from various tax incentives and simplified administrative procedures. This includes exemptions from certain regulations related to environmental, landscape, building, and port concession authorizations
- Customized Tax Credits: The extent of tax credit advantages varies by zone and depends on the size of the company, with small companies receiving a maximum of 20% tax credit, medium-sized companies 15%, and large companies 10%. Additional benefits are available for regions affected by natural disasters, such as the 2016 earthquake.
- Access to Strategic Infrastructure: The SEZs are often located in areas with good transport accessibility, which is crucial for logistics and distribution. This includes proximity to major ports, interports, and transport networks, facilitating easier movement of goods.
- Focus on Local Economic Development: The SEZs are designed to stimulate industrialization and economic growth in the region, making them attractive for companies looking to invest in areas with potential for growth and development.
- Investment in Infrastructure: The ongoing and planned infrastructural improvements in the region aim to enhance connectivity and accessibility to and from SEZs, further supporting business operations.

The SEZ's effectiveness is linked to the region's transport accessibility, which has been carefully analyzed. Campania boasts a well-developed multimodal transport network, offering good connections both nationally and locally. However, challenges such as congestion at key transport nodes and access to intermodal facilities have been identified, which could impact the operational efficiency of businesses in the zone.

The Campania SEZ plays a significant role in Italy's broader economic strategy, as highlighted by its inclusion in the National Recovery and Resilience Plan. This plan aims to provide substantial financial resources to strengthen SEZs and improve regional economies. The goal is to revitalize areas that face economic challenges by boosting industrial development and attracting foreign investment. Despite its advantages, the SEZ faces challenges related to transport bottlenecks, particularly during peak periods. Measures to address these issues, such as improving transport infrastructure and enhancing the efficiency of logistics networks, are being considered by policymakers.

=== Albania ===
The development of SEZs in Albania is particularly interesting for several reasons. For Albania, SEZs represent a key instrument to stimulate industrialization, reduce unemployment, and modernize infrastructure. Strategically located along important trade routes connecting Europe to the Balkans, Albania's SEZs position the country as a gateway for businesses looking to access markets in both Western Europe and the Mediterranean. These zones are also a way to attract advanced technologies, diversify the economy, and strengthen regional partnerships.

From the EU's perspective, Albania's SEZs are significant for fostering economic stability and growth in the Western Balkans, a region with strategic importance for European integration. Supporting the success of SEZs in Albania can help reduce regional disparities, promote political stability, and align Albania's economic policies with EU standards key steps as the country pursues EU membership sins years now. Additionally, the SEZs offer European firms an opportunity to establish operations in a cost-competitive environment while maintaining proximity to the EU market.

In Albania, the concept of Special Economic Zones (SEZs) is embodied by the "Technological and Economic Development Areas" (ZTSE), established under Law No. 54/2015. These zones aim to attract investments by creating favorable conditions for both local and foreign businesses. The ZTSE encompasses various economic activities, while excluding those that could harm the environment or national resources. They offer a distinct framework with specific fiscal and customs arrangements to promote industrial development and trade.

Companies operating in these zones benefit from several incentives, such as a 50% deduction on profits for the first five years of activity and the ability to deduct 20% of annual capital expenditures over a three-year period from the start of operations. Goods of Albanian origin delivered to the area are treated as exports with a 0% VAT rate, and constructions within the area are exempt from property tax for five years. Additionally, employers can deduct 150% of wages and social security contributions paid to employees during their first year of activity, providing a significant incentive to reduce labor cost.

The ZTSE are designed to offer flexibility in employment, allowing for atypical arrangements such as part-time or temporary contracts. This flexibility can enhance employment rates and boost the local economy. Among its development goals, the Albanian government is focusing on specific zones like Koplik and Spitale to stimulate regional economic activity and generate jobs.

This economic incentive model seeks to create a favorable business environment, inspired by successful models elsewhere, such as the Shannon Free Zone in Ireland or the Special Economic Zones in Poland, which have demonstrated their effectiveness in attracting foreign investments and fostering local economic development. Ultimately, the ZTSE aim to leverage a combination of fiscal incentives, regulatory flexibility, and targeted development strategies to boost productivity and drive economic growth in Albania.

=== Philippines ===
The Philippine Economic Zone Authority (PEZA; Filipino: Pangasiwaan sa Sonang Pangkabuhayan ng Pilipinas), formerly known as the Foreign Trade Zone Authority (FTZA) and Export Processing Zone Authority (EPZA), is a Philippine government agency attached to the Department of Trade and Industry.

It was created to help promote investments in the export-oriented manufacturing industry into the country by assisting investors in registering and facilitating their business operations and providing tax incentives. PEZA also assists investors who locate in service facilities inside special economic zones in the country (areas are called PEZA Special Economic Zones) which are usually business process outsourcing and knowledge process outsourcing firms. Other activities also eligible for PEZA registration and incentives include establishment and operation within special economic zones for tourism, medical tourism, logistics and warehousing services, economic zone development and operation and facilities providers.

== Types ==
The term special economic zone can include:

- Free-trade zones (FTZ)
- Export processing zones (EPZ)
- Free economic zones (FZ/ FEZ)
- Industrial parks / estates (IE)
- Free ports
- Bonded logistics parks (BLP)
- Urban enterprise zones

World Bank special economic zone types
Type	Objective	Size	Typical Location	Typical Activities	Markets
FTZ	Support trade	<50 hectares (120 acres)	Port of entry	Entrepôts and trade related	Domestic, re-export
EPZ (traditional)	Export manufacturing	<100 hectares (250 acres)	None	Manufacturing, processing	Mostly export
EPZ (single Unit/free enterprise)	Export manufacturing	No minimum	Countrywide	Manufacturing, processing	Mostly export
EPZ (hybrid)	Export manufacturing	<100 hectares (250 acres)	None	Manufacturing, processing	Export, domestic
Free port/SEZ	Integrated development	>1,000 hectares (2,500 acres)	None	Multi-use	Internal, domestic, export
Urban enterprise zone	Urban revitalization	<50 hectares (120 acres)	Urban/rural	Multi-use	Domestic

== Challenges ==
SEZs do not differ from other facilities in industrializing economies. As with any technique administered used by a globalized economy there are oversights by actors that are not domestic. Transnational criminal organizations and terrorist groups have taken advantage of Special Economic Zones and their lack of regulations.

SEZs also pose significant governance challenges. The preferential treatment granted to businesses within these zones can lead to regulatory arbitrage, where companies exploit differences in laws to their advantage, often at the expense of environmental and labor standards. This has sparked concerns about externalities, such as increased pollution and strained public resources, that extend beyond the boundaries of the SEZs.

The United Nations Office on Drugs and Crime (UNODC) has raised concerns several times about Laos being used by organized crime to traffic drugs, precursor chemicals and other illicit commodities, that unregulated border casinos in the Mekong region including Kings Romans are being used to launder money.

In Cambodia, the MDS Heng He Thmorda Special Economic Zone has been reported to house online crime syndicates involved in human trafficking and forced criminality. In the Philippines, raids have occurred in the Clark Freeport Zone, uncovering illegal online crime sites and rescuing hundreds of suspected human trafficking victims. Some border zones that have become deeply entwined with criminal activity have describes themselves as special economic zones, but in reality they have no such legal designation, such as the Yatai New City complex in Myawaddy, Myanmar.

Despite these challenges, many SEZs continue to function as key drivers of economic development and demonstrate that these outcomes will vary with government policies, regulations, and local conditions.

== See also ==
- List of special economic zones by country
- Exclusive economic zone
- Urban enterprise zone
- Four Asian Tigers
- Free economic zone
- Open Balkan
- Craiova Group
- CEFTA
