= List of regional organizations by population =

The following is a list of regional organizations by population.

== List ==
Flag or Logo	Organization	Founded	Population	% of world	Members	Notes
	World		8,275,513,000	100%		Population Clock
	Asia Cooperation Dialogue	2002	4,789,652,077	58%	Afghanistan Bahrain Bangladesh Bhutan Brunei Cambodia China India Indonesia Iran Japan Kazakhstan South Korea Kuwait Kyrgyzstan Laos Malaysia Mongolia Myanmar Nepal Oman Pakistan Philippines Qatar Russia Saudi Arabia Singapore Sri Lanka Tajikistan Thailand Turkey United Arab Emirates Uzbekistan Vietnam	Membership overlap with ASEAN, SAARC, Commonwealth of Nations, CIS
	Shanghai Cooperation Organisation	2001	3,378,154,602	41%	China India Kazakhstan Kyrgyzstan Pakistan Russia Tajikistan Uzbekistan	Membership overlap with CIS and Eurasian Economic Community, Asia-Pacific Economic Cooperation, South Asian Association for Regional Cooperation, Commonwealth of Nations
	BRICS	2008	3,040,000,000	37%	Brazil Russia India China South Africa	An association of five major emerging national economies. Membership overlap with Commonwealth of Nations and CIS.
	Asia-Pacific Economic Cooperation	1989	2,700,000,000	33%	Australia Brunei Canada Chile China Hong Kong Indonesia Japan South Korea Malaysia Mexico New Zealand Papua New Guinea Peru Philippines Russia Singapore Taiwan Thailand United States Vietnam	Membership overlap with Association of Southeast Asian Nations, Commonwealth of Nations, Eurasian Economic Community, North American Free Trade Agreement, NATO, OPEC, Organisation internationale de la Francophonie, Shanghai Cooperation Organisation, Mercosur/Mercosul, Union of South American Nations, African, Caribbean and Pacific Group of States,
	Commonwealth of Nations	1931	2,418,964,000	29%	Antigua and Barbuda Australia Bahamas Bangladesh Barbados Belize Botswana Brunei Cameroon Canada Cyprus Dominica Eswatini Fiji Gabon Gambia Ghana Grenada Guyana India Jamaica Kenya Kiribati Lesotho Malawi Malaysia Maldives Malta Mauritius Mozambique Namibia Nauru New Zealand Nigeria Pakistan Papua New Guinea Rwanda Saint Kitts and Nevis Saint Lucia Saint Vincent and the Grenadines Samoa Seychelles Sierra Leone Singapore Solomon Islands South Africa Sri Lanka Tanzania Togo Tonga Trinidad and Tobago Tuvalu Uganda United Kingdom Vanuatu Zambia	Membership overlap with European Union, European Economic Area, African, Caribbean and Pacific Group of States, African Union, South Asian Association for Regional Cooperation, Union of South American Nations, Caribbean Community, CARIFORUM, NATO, and Association of Southeast Asian Nations, Asia-Pacific Economic Cooperation, Small Island Developing States, Organisation internationale de la Francophonie
	Regional Comprehensive Economic Partnership	2020	2,041,590,650	25%	Australia Brunei Cambodia China Indonesia Japan South Korea Laos Malaysia Myanmar New Zealand Philippines Singapore Thailand Vietnam	A Free Trade Agreement (FTA) scheme of the 10 ASEAN Member States and its FTA Partners (Australia, China, Japan, Korea and New Zealand).
	South Asian Association for Regional Cooperation	1985	1,713,870,000	21%	Afghanistan Bangladesh Bhutan India Maldives Nepal Pakistan Sri Lanka	Membership overlap with Economic Cooperation Organization, Commonwealth of Nations.
	South Atlantic Peace and Cooperation Zone	1986	1,552,860,934	19%	Argentina Angola Benin Brazil Cape Verde Cameroon Congo DR Congo Equatorial Guinea Gabon Gambia Ghana Guinea Guinea-Bissau Ivory Coast Liberia Namibia Nigeria São Tomé and Príncipe Senegal Sierra Leone South Africa Togo Uruguay	Membership overlap with Commonwealth of Nations, Organisation internationale de la Francophonie
	Organization for Security and Co-operation in Europe	1975	1,276,751,497	15%	Albania Andorra Armenia Austria Azerbaijan Belarus Belgium Bosnia and Herzegovina Bulgaria Canada Croatia Cyprus Czech Republic Denmark Estonia Finland France Georgia Germany Greece Hungary Iceland Ireland Italy Kazakhstan Kyrgyzstan Latvia Liechtenstein Lithuania Luxembourg Malta Moldova Monaco Mongolia Montenegro Netherlands North Macedonia Norway Poland Portugal Romania Russia San Marino Serbia Slovakia Slovenia Spain Sweden Switzerland Tajikistan Turkey Turkmenistan Ukraine United Kingdom United States Uzbekistan Vatican City	Membership overlap with EU, NATO, Commonwealth of Nations, Organisation Internationale de la Francophonie
	African Union	2002	1,275,920,972	15%	Algeria Angola Benin Botswana Burkina Faso Burundi Cape Verde Cameroon Central African Republic Chad Comoros DR Congo Djibouti Egypt Equatorial Guinea Eritrea Eswatini Ethiopia Gabon Gambia Ghana Guinea Guinea-Bissau Ivory Coast Kenya Lesotho Liberia Libya Madagascar Malawi Mali Mauritania Mauritius Morocco Mozambique Namibia Niger Nigeria Congo Rwanda Sahrawi Arab Democratic Republic São Tomé and Príncipe Senegal Seychelles Sierra Leone Somalia South Africa South Sudan Sudan Tanzania Togo Tunisia Uganda Zambia Zimbabwe	Membership overlap with Commonwealth of Nations, Organisation internationale de la Francophonie
	Organisation internationale de la Francophonie	1970	1,000,000,000	12%	Albania Andorra Armenia Belgium ( French Community of Belgium) Benin Bulgaria Burkina Faso Burundi Cambodia Cameroon Canada ( New Brunswick) ( Quebec) Cape Verde Central African Republic Chad Comoros Congo DR Congo Djibouti Dominica Equatorial Guinea Egypt France Gabon Greece Guinea Guinea-Bissau Haiti Ivory Coast Laos Lebanon Luxembourg Madagascar Mali Mauritania Mauritius Moldova Monaco Morocco North Macedonia Niger Romania Rwanda Saint Lucia São Tomé and Príncipe Senegal Seychelles Switzerland Togo Tunisia Vanuatu Vietnam	Membership overlap with North Atlantic Treaty Organization, European Economic Area, North American Free Trade Agreement, Arab League, Association of Caribbean States, Caribbean Community, Commonwealth of Nations
	Organization of American States	1948	980,457,921	12%	Antigua and Barbuda Argentina Bahamas Barbados Belize Bolivia Brazil Canada Chile Colombia Costa Rica Dominica Dominican Republic Ecuador El Salvador Grenada Guatemala Guyana Haiti Honduras Jamaica Mexico Nicaragua Panama Paraguay Peru Saint Kitts and Nevis Saint Lucia Saint Vincent and the Grenadines Suriname Trinidad and Tobago United States Uruguay Venezuela	Membership overlap with NATO, North American Free Trade Agreement, Mercosur/Mercosul, Asia-Pacific Economic Cooperation, Union of South American States, CAFTA-DR, Community of Latin American and Caribbean States, RIO Group, Caribbean Community, Association of Caribbean States, Commonwealth of Nations, Organisation internationale de la Francophonie
	North Atlantic Treaty Organization	1949	880,978,798	11%	Albania Belgium Bulgaria Canada Croatia Czech Republic Denmark Estonia Finland France Germany Greece Hungary Iceland Italy Latvia Lithuania Luxembourg Montenegro Netherlands North Macedonia Norway Poland Portugal Romania Slovakia Slovenia Spain Sweden Turkey United Kingdom United States	Membership overlap with Commonwealth of Nations, European Union, Organisation internationale de la Francophonie, Asia-Pacific Economic Cooperation, North American Free Trade Agreement, Organization of American States)
	Council of Europe	1949	820,000,000	9.9%	Albania Andorra Armenia Austria Azerbaijan Belgium Bosnia and Herzegovina Bulgaria Croatia Cyprus Czech Republic Denmark Estonia Finland France Georgia Germany Greece Hungary Iceland Ireland Italy Latvia Liechtenstein Lithuania Luxembourg Malta Moldova Monaco Montenegro Netherlands North Macedonia Norway Poland Portugal Romania San Marino Serbia Slovakia Slovenia Spain Sweden Switzerland Turkey Ukraine United Kingdom	Membership overlap with Commonwealth of Nations, Organisation internationale de la Francophonie
	Inter-American Treaty of Reciprocal Assistance	1948	754,901,942	9.1%	Argentina Bahamas Brazil Chile Colombia Costa Rica Dominican Republic El Salvador Guatemala Haiti Honduras Panama Paraguay Peru Trinidad and Tobago United States Venezuela	Membership overlap with Organization of American States, Commonwealth of Nations, Organisation internationale de la Francophonie
	Community of Latin American and Caribbean States	2010	652,012,001	7.9%	Antigua and Barbuda Argentina Bahamas Barbados Belize Bolivia Chile Colombia Costa Rica Cuba Dominica Dominican Republic Ecuador El Salvador Grenada Guatemala Guyana Haiti Honduras Jamaica Mexico Nicaragua Panama Paraguay Peru Saint Kitts and Nevis Saint Lucia Saint Vincent and the Grenadines Suriname Trinidad and Tobago Uruguay Venezuela	Membership overlap with Organization of American States, Commonwealth of Nations, Organisation internationale de la Francophonie
	Association of Southeast Asian Nations	1967	647,016,000	7.8%	Brunei Cambodia Indonesia Laos Malaysia Myanmar Philippines Singapore Thailand Vietnam	Membership overlap with Asia-Pacific Economic Cooperation, African, Caribbean and Pacific Group of States, Small Islands Developing States, Commonwealth of Nations, Organisation internationale de la Francophonie
	Latin American Integration Association	1980	515,722,726	6.2%	Argentina Bolivia Brazil Chile Colombia Cuba Ecuador Mexico Paraguay Panama Peru Uruguay Venezuela	Membership overlap with Organization of American States
	European Economic Area	1994	515,000,000	6.2%	Austria Belgium Bulgaria Croatia Cyprus Czech Republic Denmark European Union Estonia Finland France Germany Greece Hungary Iceland Ireland Italy Latvia Liechtenstein Lithuania Luxembourg Malta Netherlands Norway Poland Portugal Romania Slovakia Slovenia Spain Sweden Switzerland	Membership overlap with European Union, European Free Trade Association, Commonwealth of Nations, Organisation internationale de la Francophonie
	United States–Mexico–Canada Agreement	1994	490,000,000	5.9%	Canada Mexico United States	Membership overlap with Commonwealth of Nations, NATO, Organisation internationale de la Francophonie, Asia-Pacific Economic Cooperation, CAFTA-DR, Organization of American States
	Economic Cooperation Organization	1985	488,405,949	5.9%	Afghanistan Azerbaijan Iran Kazakhstan Kyrgyzstan Pakistan Tajikistan Turkey Turkmenistan Uzbekistan	Membership overlap with South Asian Association for Regional Cooperation, Commonwealth of Nations
European Union	European Union	1957	447,700,000	5.4%	Austria Belgium Bulgaria Croatia Cyprus Czech Republic Denmark Estonia Finland France Germany Greece Hungary Ireland Italy Latvia Lithuania Luxembourg Malta Netherlands Poland Portugal Romania Slovakia Slovenia Spain Sweden	Membership overlap with NATO, Commonwealth of Nations, European Economic Area, Organisation internationale de la Francophonie
	Arab League	1945	423,000,000	5.1%	Algeria Bahrain Comoros Djibouti Egypt Iraq Jordan Kuwait Lebanon Libya Mauritania Morocco Oman Palestine Qatar Saudi Arabia Somalia Sudan Syria Tunisia United Arab Emirates Yemen	Membership overlap with African Union, Organisation internationale de la Francophonie
	Forum for the Progress and Development of South America	2019	395,765,660	4.8%	Argentina Brazil Chile Colombia Ecuador Guyana Paraguay Peru	Membership overlap with Commonwealth of Nations
	OPEC	1960	369,814,472	4.5%	Algeria Angola Congo Equatorial Guinea Gabon Iran Iraq Kuwait Libya Nigeria Saudi Arabia United Arab Emirates Venezuela	Membership overlap with Shanghai Cooperation Organisation, South Asian Association for Regional Cooperation, Organization of American States, African Union, Economic Cooperation Organization, Union of South American Nations, Arab League, Mercosur or Mercosul, Commonwealth of Nations, Organisation internationale de la Francophonie
	Organization of the Black Sea Economic Cooperation	1992	330,000,000	4.0%	Albania Armenia Azerbaijan Bulgaria Georgia Greece Moldova Romania Russia Serbia Turkey Ukraine	Membership overlap with CIS, Organisation internationale de la Francophonie
	Council of the Baltic Sea States	1992	300,744,708	3.6%	Denmark Estonia Finland Germany Iceland Latvia Lithuania Norway Poland Russia Sweden	Membership overlap with EU, CIS, Nordic Council, OBSEC.
	Commonwealth of Independent States	1991	277,983,490	3.4%	Azerbaijan Belarus Kazakhstan Kyrgyzstan Armenia Moldova Russia Tajikistan Uzbekistan	Membership overlap with Asia-Pacific Economic Cooperation
	Mercosur/Mercosul	1991	265,212,435	3.2%	Argentina Brazil Paraguay Uruguay	Membership overlap with Union of South American Nations, Asia-Pacific Economic Cooperation, Unions of South American Nations, Latin Union, Community of Latin American and Caribbean States, RIO Group, Organization of American States
	Association of Caribbean States	1994	237,000,000	2.9%	Antigua and Barbuda Bahamas Barbados Belize Colombia Costa Rica Cuba Dominica Dominican Republic El Salvador Grenada Guatemala Guyana Haiti Honduras Jamaica Mexico Nicaragua Panama Saint Kitts and Nevis Saint Lucia Saint Vincent and the Grenadines Suriname Trinidad and Tobago Venezuela	An economic zone of Central American plus Caribbean states along with northern South America. Membership overlap with Latin Union, Commonwealth of Nations, Organisation internationale de la Francophonie, Community of Latin American and Caribbean States, Union of South American Nations, Caribbean Community, CARIFORUM, RIO Group, CAFTA-DR, Organization of American States
	Pacific Alliance	2012	218,536,683	2.6%	Chile Colombia Mexico Peru	Membership overlap with Organization of American States
	Collective Security Treaty Organisation	1994	210,000,000	2.5%	Armenia Belarus Kazakhstan Kyrgyzstan Russia Tajikistan	Membership overlap with Commonwealth of Independent States, Shanghai Cooperation Organisation, Asia-Pacific Economic Cooperation
	Eurasian Economic Union	2001	205,693,649	2.5%	Armenia Belarus Kazakhstan Kyrgyzstan Russia	Membership overlap with Commonwealth of Independent States and Shanghai Cooperation Organisation, Asia-Pacific Economic Cooperation
	Organization of Turkic States	2009	151,041,079	1.8%	Azerbaijan Kazakhstan Kyrgyzstan Turkey Uzbekistan	Membership overlap with Economic Cooperation Organization
	South-East European Cooperation Process	1996	150,492,458	1.8%	Albania Bosnia and Herzegovina Bulgaria Croatia Greece Kosovo Moldova Montenegro North Macedonia Romania Serbia Slovenia Turkey	Membership overlap with EU, Council of Europe and Organisation internationale de la Francophonie.
	British-Irish Council	1999	73,072,783	0.88%	Guernsey Ireland Isle of Man Jersey United Kingdom	Membership overlap with EU and Commonwealth of Nations. The devolved institutions of Northern Ireland, Scotland and Wales are represented separately.
	Visegrád Group	1991	65,798,553	0.80%	Czech Republic Hungary Poland Slovakia	Membership overlap with EU
	GUAM Organization for Democracy and Economic Development	1999	62,140,327	0.75%	Azerbaijan Georgia Moldova Ukraine	Membership overlap with EU
	Central American Integration System	1993	51,152,936	0.62%	Belize Costa Rica Dominican Republic El Salvador Guatemala Honduras Nicaragua Panama	An economic and political organization of eight Central American states Membership overlap with Latin Union, Community of Latin American and Caribbean States, Union of South American Nations, Association of Caribbean States, RIO Group, CAFTA-DR, Organization of American States, Commonwealth of Nations
	Union of South American Nations	2005	49,002,000	0.59%	Bolivia Guyana Suriname Uruguay Venezuela	Membership overlap with Mercosur/Mercosul, Asia-Pacific Economic Cooperation, Latin Union, Community of Latin American and Caribbean States, RIO Group, Association of Caribbean States, Commonwealth of Nations
	Pacific Islands Forum	1971	40,054,000	0.48%	Australia Cook Islands Fiji French Polynesia Kiribati Marshall Islands Federated States of Micronesia Nauru New Caledonia New Zealand Niue Palau Papua New Guinea Samoa Solomon Islands Tonga Tuvalu Vanuatu	Membership overlaps with APEC, Commonwealth of Nations
	Benelux	1948	29,300,000	0.35%	Belgium Luxembourg Netherlands	Membership overlap with EU, Organisation internationale de la Francophonie
	Nordic Council	1953	25,880,000	0.31%	Denmark Finland Iceland Norway Sweden	Membership overlap with EU
	Central European Free Trade Agreement	1992	21,907,354	0.26%	Albania Bosnia and Herzegovina Kosovo (through UNMIK) Moldova Montenegro North Macedonia Serbia	Membership overlap with Organisation internationale de la Francophonie
	Caribbean Community	1973	18,095,201	0.22%	Antigua and Barbuda Bahamas Barbados Belize Dominica Grenada Guyana Haiti Jamaica Montserrat Saint Kitts and Nevis Saint Lucia Saint Vincent and the Grenadines Suriname Trinidad and Tobago	An economic organization made up of fifteen full members, (fourteen independent countries + one British overseas territory.) Membership overlap with Commonwealth of Nations, Organisation internationale de la Francophonie, Small Islands Developing States, CARIFORUM, Community of Latin American and Caribbean States, Union of South American Nations, Association of Caribbean States, Organization of Eastern Caribbean States, RIO Group, Central American Integration System, Organization of American States
	European Free Trade Association	1960	14,050,000	0.17%	Iceland Liechtenstein Norway Switzerland	Membership overlap with EEA, Organisation internationale de la Francophonie.
	Organisation of Eastern Caribbean States	1981	609,184	0.0074%	Antigua and Barbuda Dominica Grenada Montserrat Saint Kitts and Nevis Saint Lucia Saint Vincent and the Grenadines	Membership overlap with CARICOM, Commonwealth of Nations and Organisation internationale de la Francophonie.
