= Cayman Islands dollar =

Currency

ISO 4217
- Code: KYD (numeric: 136)
- Subunit: 0.01

Units of account
- Base unit: dollar
- Plural: dollars
- Symbol: $
- Subunit
- 1/100: cent
- Plural
- cent: cents

Denominations
- Banknotes
- Freq. used: $1, $5, $10, $25, $50, $100
- Rarely used: $40, $70 (commemorative)
- Coins
- Freq. used: 1, 5, 10, 25 cents

Demographics
- Date of introduction: 1972
- User(s): Cayman Islands (British Overseas Territory)

Issuance
- Central bank: Cayman Islands Monetary Authority
- Website: www.cimoney.com.ky

Valuation
- Inflation: -0.1%
- Source: March 2009
- Pegged with: CI$1.00=US$1.20

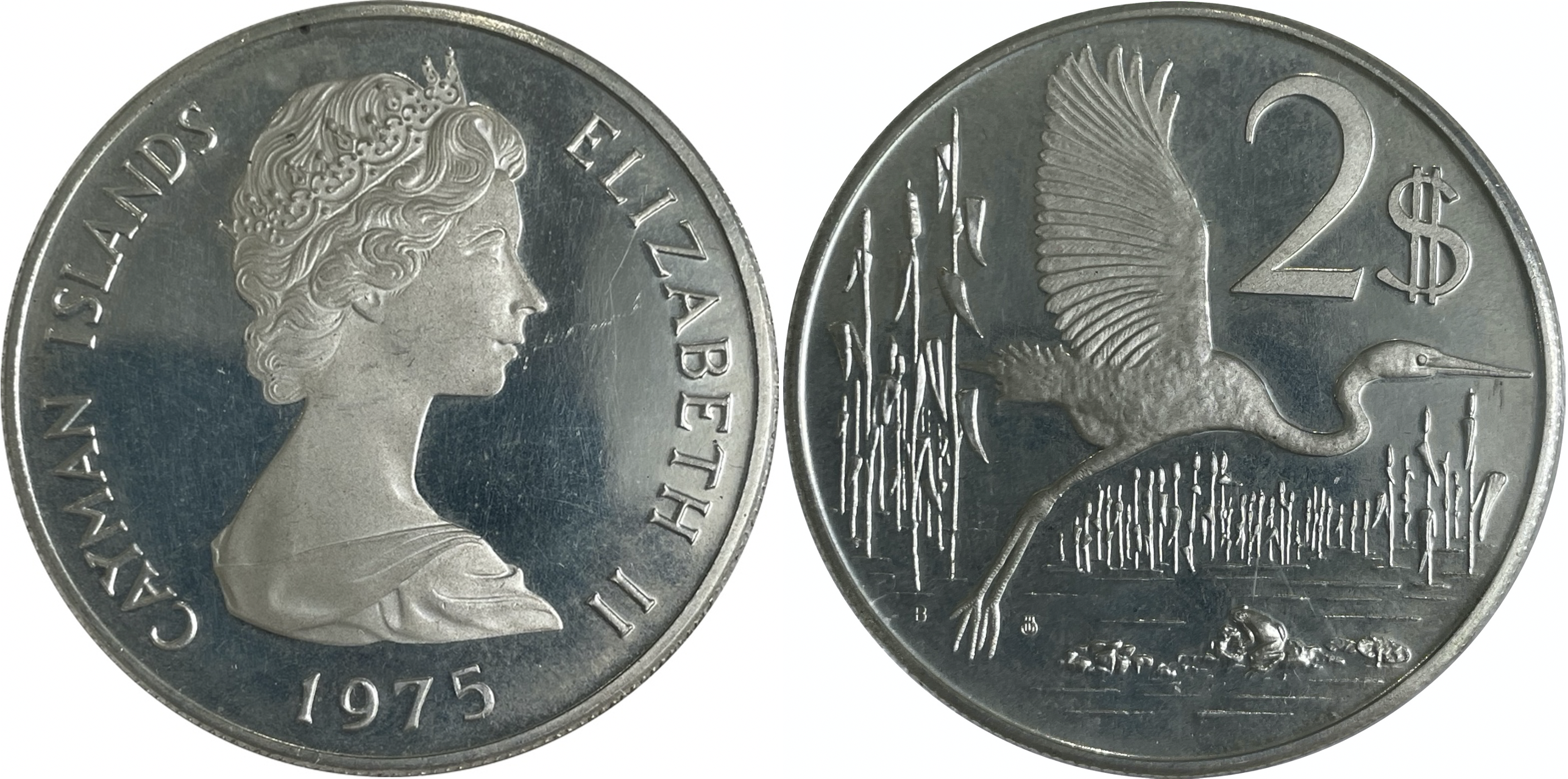
Non-circulating commemorative $2 coin from 1975

The Cayman Islands dollar (currency code KYD; symbol: $ or CI$) is the currency of the Cayman Islands, a British Overseas Territory. It was introduced in 1972 to replace the Jamaican dollar. Its base unit is the dollar; each dollar is subdivided into 100 cents.

The Cayman Islands dollar has been pegged to the United States dollar at 1 Cayman Islands dollar = 1.2 U.S. dollars since 1 April 1974.

== History ==
The Cayman Islands dollar was introduced in 1972 (10 years after separation from the Colony of Jamaica), replacing the Jamaican dollar at par. Jamaican currency and Cayman Islands dollars both remained legal tender until 31 August 1972, when Jamaican currency ceased to be legal tender. The Cayman Islands dollar has been pegged to the United States dollar at 1 Cayman Islands dollar = 1.2 U.S. dollars since 1 April 1974, when the Currency Law of 1974 was enacted. In 1983, the 1974 law was repealed and replaced by the Currency Law Revised, which itself was replaced in 1997 by section 22 of the Monetary Authority Law. Under section 22 of the 2013 revision of the Monetary Authority Law, the value of the Cayman dollar in United States Dollars is determined by the Governor. In February 2023, it was reported that the Monetary Authority was seeking public input for a new set of coin and banknote designs, which will feature King Charles III. Following the completion of this process, the Monetary Authority will authorise production of the new designs, then gradually phase them into circulation.

== Coins ==
In 1972, coins in denominations of 1¢, 5¢, 10¢ and 25¢ were introduced. The 1¢ was struck in bronze, with the other denominations in cupronickel. From 1992, copper and nickel-plated steel replaced bronze and cupronickel, respectively.

Coins of the Cayman Islands dollar
Image	Value	Technical parameters				Description			Date of first minting
Image	Value	Diameter	Thickness	Mass	Composition	Edge	Obverse	Reverse	Date of first minting
	1 cent	17 mm	1.72 mm	2.55 g	Copper-plated steel	Smooth	Queen Elizabeth II	Grand Cayman thrush	1999
	5 cents	18 mm	1.1 mm	2 g	Nickel-plated steel	Smooth	Queen Elizabeth II	Cayman crawfish	1999
	10 cents	21 mm	1.46 mm	3.45 g	Nickel-plated steel	Smooth	Queen Elizabeth II	Green sea turtle	1999
	25 cents	24.26 mm	1.61 mm	5.1 g	Nickel-plated steel	Smooth	Queen Elizabeth II	Schooner "Kirk B"	1999

== Banknotes ==
On 1 May 1972, the Cayman Islands Currency Board introduced notes in denominations of 1, 5, 10 and 25 dollars. 40 dollar notes were introduced in 1981 but were taken out of circulation a few years later, followed by 100 dollars in 1982 and 50 dollars in 1987. On 1 January 1997, the Cayman Islands Monetary Authority (CIMA) took over issuance of paper money, issuing notes for 1, 5, 10, 25, 50 and 100 dollars. The current series of notes was issued on 4 April 2011.

The CIMA issued notes of 70 dollars in 2023 to commemorate the anniversary of the death of Elizabeth II and the Platinum Jubilee of Elizabeth II.

2010 "D Series" issue
Obverse	Reverse	Value	Dimensions	Main Color	Description		Date of issue	Date of first issue	Watermark
Obverse	Reverse	Value	Dimensions	Main Color	Obverse	Reverse	Date of issue	Date of first issue	Watermark
		$1	156 x 66 mm	Blue	Angel fish; map of the Cayman Islands; Coat of arms of the Cayman Islands; Queen Elizabeth II	Nautilus shell; The Bluff on Cayman Brac	2010	April 4, 2011	Turtle; electrotype "CIMA"; Cornerstones
		$5	156 x 66 mm	Green	Hawksbill turtles; map of the Cayman Islands; Coat of arms of the Cayman Islands; Queen Elizabeth II	Conch shell; Cayman parrots	2010	April 4, 2011	Turtle; electrotype "CIMA"; Cornerstones
		$10	156 x 66 mm	Pink	Landcrabs; map of the Cayman Islands; Coat of arms of the Cayman Islands; Queen Elizabeth II	Shell; wild banana orchid	2010	April 4, 2011	Turtle; electrotype "CIMA"; Cornerstones
		$25	156 x 66 mm	Brown	Scallop shells; map of the Cayman Islands; Coat of arms of the Cayman Islands; Queen Elizabeth II	Scallop shell; Hawksbill turtle; fish; coral	2010	April 4, 2011	Turtle; electrotype "CIMA"; Cornerstones
		$50	156 x 66 mm	Purple	Stingrays; map of the Cayman Islands; Coat of arms of the Cayman Islands; Queen Elizabeth II	Shell; stingray	2010	April 4, 2011	Turtle; electrotype "CIMA"; Cornerstones
		$100	156 x 66 mm	Red	Cayman Schooner boats; map of the Cayman Islands; Coat of arms of the Cayman Islands; Queen Elizabeth II	Conch shell; Aerial view of the Financial Center in George Town	2010	April 4, 2011	Turtle; electrotype "CIMA"; Cornerstones

== Exchange rates ==
Current KYD exchange rates
From Google Finance:	AUD CAD CHF CNY EUR GBP HKD JPY USD EUR JPY
From Yahoo! Finance:	AUD CAD CHF CNY EUR GBP HKD JPY USD EUR JPY
From XE.com:	AUD CAD CHF CNY EUR GBP HKD JPY USD EUR JPY
From OANDA:	AUD CAD CHF CNY EUR GBP HKD JPY USD EUR JPY

On the islands, the US dollar is accepted as legal currency by hotels, restaurants, and retail establishments at the rate of 1 US Dollar for every 80 Cayman cents. Change is usually given in Cayman Island dollars.

Banks buy US Dollars at 82 Cayman Island cents each and sell 1.20 US dollars per Cayman Island dollar. As of 2014, the Cayman Islands Monetary Authority uses a retail exchange rate of CI$1.00 = US$1.227.

== See also ==
- Cayman Islands Monetary Authority
- Central banks and currencies of the Caribbean
- Economy of the Cayman Islands
