= Jamaican dollar =

Currency of Jamaica

Jumiekan dala (Jamaican Patois)
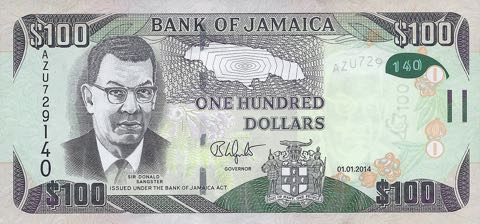
100 dollar banknote (obverse)
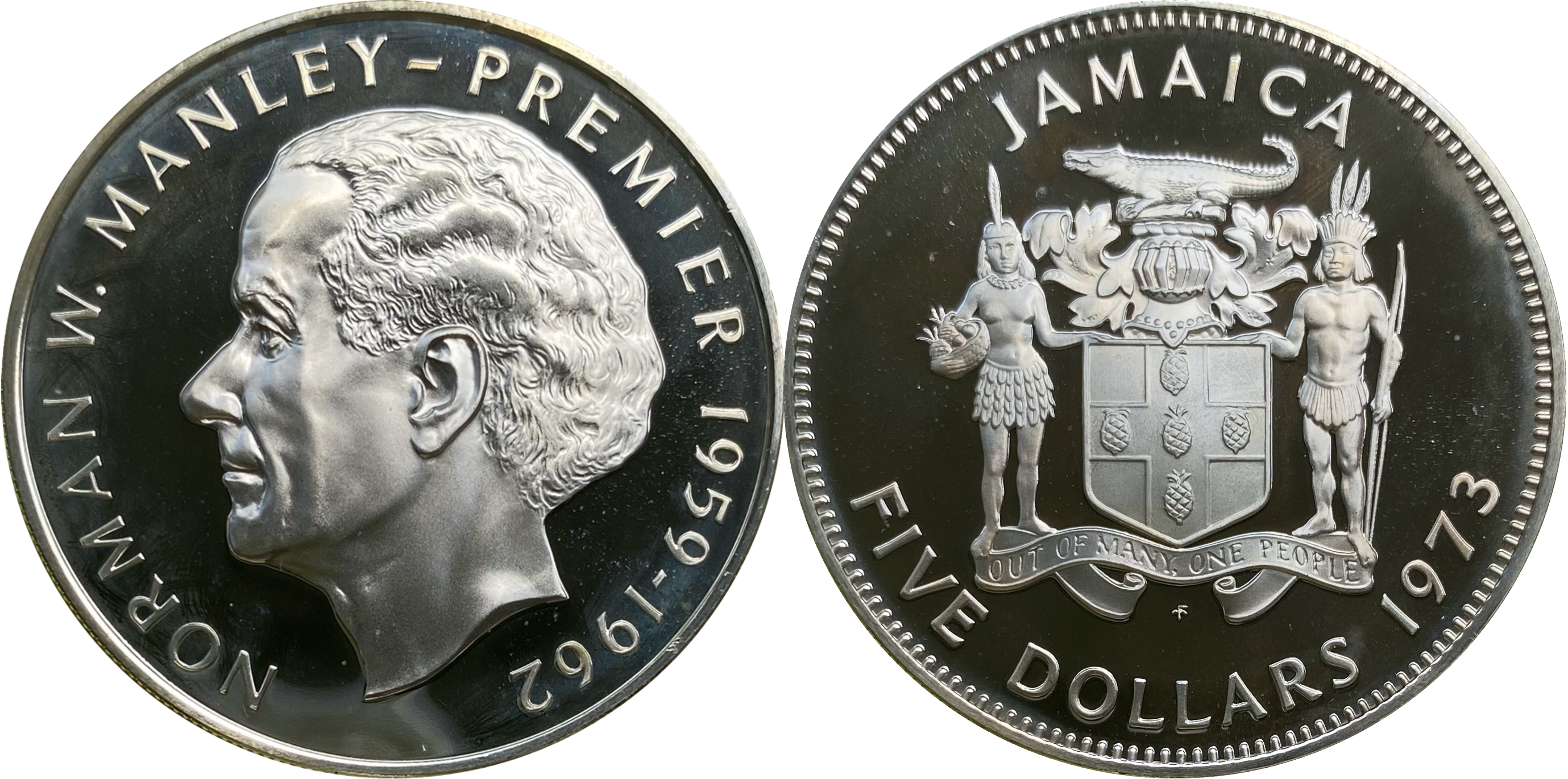
5 dollar coin

ISO 4217
- Code: JMD (numeric: 388)
- Subunit: 0.01

Units of account
- Base unit: dollar
- Plural: dollars
- Symbol: $
- Subunit
- 1/100: cent (Note: Cent-denominated coins are now rarely used due to inflation, but prices may be valued in cents.)
- Plural
- cent (Note: Cent-denominated coins are now rarely used due to inflation, but prices may be valued in cents.): cents

Denominations
- Banknotes
- Freq. used: $50, $100, $500, $1000, $2000, $5000
- Coins
- Freq. used: $1, $5, $10, $20

Demographics
- Date of introduction: 8 September 1969
- Replaced: Jamaican pound
- User(s): Jamaica

Issuance
- Central bank: Bank of Jamaica
- Website: www.boj.org.jm

Valuation
- Inflation: 4.64%
- Source: , Nov 2019

The Jamaican dollar (sign: $ or J$; code: JMD) has been the currency of Jamaica since 1969. Its base unit is the dollar. Each dollar is divided into 100 cents, however cent-denominated coins are no longer in use as of 2018. Goods and services may still be priced in cents, but cash transactions are now rounded to the nearest dollar.

== Exchange rate ==
Current JMD exchange rates
From Google Finance:	AUD CAD CHF CNY EUR GBP HKD JPY USD
From Yahoo! Finance:	AUD CAD CHF CNY EUR GBP HKD JPY USD
From XE.com:	AUD CAD CHF CNY EUR GBP HKD JPY USD
From OANDA:	AUD CAD CHF CNY EUR GBP HKD JPY USD

== History ==
The history of currency in Jamaica should not be considered in isolation of the wider picture in the British West Indies as a whole; see British West Indies dollar. The peculiar feature about Jamaica was that it was the only British West Indies territory to use special issues of the sterling coinage, apart from the four-pence groat coin which was specially issued for all the British West Indies, and later only for British Guiana.

The earliest money in Jamaica was Spanish copper coins called maravedíes. This relates to the fact that for nearly four hundred years Spanish dollars, known as pieces of eight were in widespread use on the world's trading routes, including the Caribbean Sea region. However, following the revolutionary wars in Latin America, the source of these silver trade coins dried up. The last Spanish dollar was minted at the Potosí mint in 1825. The United Kingdom had adopted a very successful gold standard in 1821, so 1825 was an opportune time to introduce the British sterling coinage into all the British colonies.

An imperial order-in-council was passed in that year for the purposes of facilitating this aim by making sterling coinage legal tender in the colonies at the specified rating of $1 = 4s 4d (one Spanish dollar to four shillings and four pence sterling). As the sterling silver coins were attached to a gold standard, this exchange rate did not realistically represent the value of the silver in the Spanish dollars as compared to the value of the gold in the British gold sovereign, and as such, the order-in-council had the reverse effect in many colonies. It had the effect of actually driving sterling coinage out, rather than encouraging its circulation.

Remedial legislation had to be introduced in 1838 so as to change over to the more realistic rating of $1 = 4s 2d. However, in Jamaica, British Honduras, Bermuda, and later in the Bahamas also, the official rating was set aside in favour of what was known as the 'Maccaroni' tradition in which a British shilling, referred to as a 'Maccaroni', was treated as one quarter of a dollar. The common link between these four territories was the Bank of Nova Scotia which brought in the 'Maccaroni' tradition, resulting in the successful introduction of both sterling coinage and sterling accounts.

In 1834, silver coins of threepence and three halfpence (1 1/2 pence) were introduced, valued at 1/2 real and 1/4 real. The three-halfpence coins came to be called "quartiles" or "quatties". These in particular were used in church collections due to a feeling by the black population that copper coins were inappropriate for that purpose. Hence, they came to be called "Christian quatties".

In 1839, an act was passed by Parliament declaring that as of 31 December 1840, only British coinage would be legal tender in Jamaica, demonetising all of the Spanish coins, with the exception of the gold doubloon which was valued at £3 4s. Coins in use were thus the farthing (1/4d), halfpenny, penny, three halfpence (1 1/2d), threepence, sixpence, shilling, florin (2s), half crown (2s 6d), and crown (5s).

The emancipation of the slaves in 1838 increased the need for coinage in Jamaica, particularly low-denomination coins, but the blacks were still reluctant to use copper. The solution was to use cupronickel, adopted in 1869. Pennies and halfpennies were minted for use in Jamaica, becoming the first truly Jamaican coins. Beginning in 1880, the farthing was also minted in cupronickel.

In 1904, the first government-authorized banknotes were produced in the denomination of 10s. Banknotes of £1 and £5 were also being circulated by chartered banks. In 1918, denominations of 2s 6d and 5s were authorised. The 2s 6d note proved to have a short life, being withdrawn in 1922. In 1940, the government bank began producing £1 and £5 notes.

In October 1960, the Bank of Jamaica was given the sole right to mint coins and produce banknotes in Jamaica. Their notes were released on 1 May 1961, in the denominations of 5s, 10s, £1, and £5.

On 30 January 1968, the Jamaican House of Representatives voted to decimalise the currency by introducing the dollar, worth 10 shillings, to replace the Jamaican pound. Coins and banknotes went into circulation on 8 September 1969. The introduction of a decimal currency provided the opportunity for the introduction of a complete Jamaican coinage as formerly, the coins (with the exception of the penny and halfpenny), were the same as those used in the United Kingdom. The reverse of the decimal coinage was designed by Christopher Ironside. These coins were in circulation from 1969 to about 1990.

From its introduction, as a result of elevated levels of inflation during the 1980s and especially the early 1990s, the Jamaican dollar has fallen from a peak of J$0.77 to US$1 in its first few years of circulation to around J$160 to US$1 as of October 2025.

The new Jamaican dollar (and the Cayman Islands dollar), differed from all the other dollars in the British West Indies in that it was essentially a half-pound sterling. All the other dollars in the vicinity either began on the US dollar unit, in the case of Belize, Bermuda, and the Bahamas, or the Spanish dollar unit in the case of the Eastern Caribbean territories, Barbados and Guyana. The Spanish dollar unit at any rate was approximately the same value as the US unit.

== Coins ==
At the time of the currency's introduction, 1969, coins of 1 cent (1.2 pence), 5 cents (6 pence), 10 cents (1 shilling), 20 cents (2 shillings), and 25 cents (2 shillings 6 pence) were produced. With the exception of a smaller bronze 1 cent, the compositions, sizes, and shapes of the coins were identical to those they replaced.

The 1-cent coin was changed in 1975 to a twelve-sided shape and aluminium composition. Decagonal 50-cent coins were introduced in 1976 to replace the 50-cent banknote, but production for circulation ceased in 1989, along with that of the 20 cents. In 1990, nickel-brass 1 dollar coins were introduced to replace the banknote of the same denomination. Nickel-plated steel replaced copper-nickel in the 5, 10, and 25-cent coins in 1991 with a smaller size and seven-sided shape for the 25-cent coin. In 1994, a round nickel-plated steel 5-dollar coin replaced its corresponding banknote, a smaller, seven-sided nickel-plated steel 1 dollar coin was introduced, and the 5-cent coin was abandoned. 1995 saw smaller, round copper-plated steel 10 and 25-cent coins. All non-current coins were demonetised in January 1997. A scalloped nickel-plated steel 10-dollar coin replaced the 10-dollar note in 1999 and a bimetallic 20-dollar coin with a nickel-brass ring and copper-nickel center was introduced in place of a 20-dollar banknote in 2000. All nickel-plated or copper-plated steel coins are magnetic.

All coins have the Jamaican coat of arms on their reverse.

Coins currently in circulation are as follows:

- $1 (18.5 mm; 2.9 g; nickel-plated steel; seven-sided) Reverse: Rt. Excellent Sir Alexander Bustamante
- $5 (21.5 mm; 4.3 g; nickel-plated steel; round) Reverse: Rt. Excellent Norman Manley
- $10 (24.5 mm; 6 g; nickel-plated steel; scalloped or round) Reverse: Rt. Excellent George William Gordon
- $20 (23 mm; 7.1 g; bimetallic copper-nickel center in nickel-brass ring; round) Rt. Excellent Marcus Garvey

Coins no longer in circulation:

- 1 cent (21.08 mm; 1.22 g; aluminium; dodecagon) Reverse: Ackee (demonetised on 15 February 2018)
- 5 cents (19.4 mm; 2.83 g; copper-nickel; round) Reverse: American crocodile (demonetised in 1994)
- 10 cents (23.6 mm; 5.75 g; copper-nickel; round) Reverse: Plant leaves (demonetised on 15 February 2018)
- 10 cents (17 mm; 2.4 g; copper-plated steel; round) Reverse: Rt. Excellent Paul Bogle (demonetised on 15 February 2018)
- 20 cents (29 mm; 11.3 g; copper-nickel; round) Reverse: Three Blue mahoe trees (demonetised in 1990)
- 25 cents (32.3 mm; 14.55 g; copper-nickel; round) Reverse: Streamer-tailed Hummingbird (demonetised on 15 February 2018)
- 25 cents (20 mm; 3.6 g; copper-plated steel; round) Reverse: Rt. Excellent Marcus Garvey (demonetised on 15 February 2018)
- 50 cents (31.37 mm; 12.43 g; copper-nickel; decagon) Reverse: Rt. Excellent Marcus Garvey (demonetised in 1990)

== Banknotes ==
On 8 September 1969, banknotes of 50 cents (5 shillings), $1 (10 shillings), $2 (£1), and $10 (£5) were introduced. The $5 note was introduced on 20 October 1970, followed by the $20 in June 1976, when the 50-cent note was replaced by a coin. $100 notes were added on 2 December 1986, followed by $50 notes on 27 July 1988. The $2 note was dropped in 1994, while the $1 note was replaced by a coin in 1990. In 1994, coins replaced the $5 notes and $500 notes were introduced. In 1999, $10 coins replaced notes, while, in 2000, $20 coins replaced the notes and $1000 notes were introduced.

Banknotes currently in circulation are:

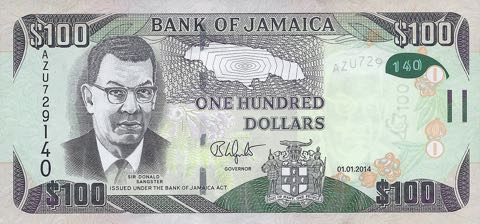
- $100 with Sir Donald Sangster
  $50 (Front: The Right Excellent Samuel Sharpe, National Hero; Back: Doctor's Cave Beach, Montego Bay)
- $100 (Front: Sir Donald Sangster; Back: Dunn's River Falls)
- $500 (Front: The Right Excellent Nanny of the Maroons; Back: Old Map of Jamaica highlighting Port Royal)
- $1000 (Front: The Honourable Michael Norman Manley, ON OCC LL.D. (Honorary); Back: Jamaica House)

The Bank of Jamaica introduced a $5000 bill into Jamaica's monetary system on 24 September 2009. It bears the portrait of former Prime Minister of Jamaica, The Honourable Hugh Lawson Shearer. On 18 May 2009, a specimen note was presented to the former Prime Minister's widow, Dr. Denise Eldemire-Shearer. Finance Minister Audley Shaw criticised the decision to introduce the banknote, saying that the introduction of such a banknote is a sign that the Jamaican dollar is losing value.

On 15 November 2010, the Bank of Jamaica issued a $50 commemorative note to celebrate its founding. The note is similar to its regular issue in design and security features, but the bank's logo printed in blue, with the words "50th anniversary" and "1960–2010" printed above and below the logo. The back of the commemorative note features the Bank of Jamaica headquarters building in Nethersole Place set against a background of morning glory blossoms. Both the commemorative and the regular issue note circulate in parallel.

In 2012, the Bank of Jamaica introduced a new family of banknotes commemorating the country's Golden Jubilee. The commemorative banknotes are similar to its regular issue banknotes, but on the obverse it features the "Jamaica 50" logo superimposed on the watermark on the front of each note. The unique image, which is normally on the reverse side of each note, has been replaced by a photograph of a group of children from Central Branch Primary School, from 1962. It formerly appeared on the $2 note, which was in circulation from 1969 to 1994.

Currently, the Jamaican banknotes are printed on a cotton material which has a relatively short life in the country's tropical climate and other circulation conditions, but the new notes will come on enhanced substrates.

The $100 note is printed on a material called "hybrid", a combination of a protected polyester film layered on a cotton fibre core. The $50, $500, and $1000 notes are printed on a varnished cotton substrate, that is, the traditional cotton treated with a varnish after the notes have been printed. Varnishing creates a moisture-proof layer to protect the banknotes against surface soiling and reduces the extent to which they will absorb moisture, contaminant particles and microorganisms. The $5000 note remains on a regular cotton substrate as the main security thread, "Optiks", is compatible only with the cotton based material.

The commemorative notes are released into circulation on 23 July 2012 and the new notes will circulate alongside the regular issue banknotes.

On 24 March 2014, the Bank of Jamaica issued a $50 note printed on the "Hybrid" substrate. In 2015, the Bank of Jamaica issued a $100 note dated 1 January 2014 on the "Hybrid" substrate.

The $1000 note features an image of the Jamaican Swallowtail, the largest butterfly in the western hemisphere which is also endemic to Jamaica.

At the 2022/23 Jamaican Budget Debate, the Minister of Finance and the Public Service, Dr. the Honorable Nigel Clarke, revealed the new banknote series commemorating the 60th anniversary of Jamaica. Included in the new banknote series is the new $2000 denomination. The new banknotes were revealed on 8 March 2022. It is Jamaica's first series of polymer banknotes. Cotton banknotes circulated in parallel with the polymer banknotes and remained legal tender until 1 July 2025.

== Use outside Jamaica ==
The Jamaican dollar was used not only by Jamaica, but also by the Cayman Islands and Turks and Caicos Islands, former dependencies of Jamaica, until 1972 and 1973 respectively. In 1972, the Cayman Islands stopped using the Jamaican dollar and adopted its own currency, the Cayman Islands dollar, while in 1973 the Turks and Caicos Islands replaced the Jamaican dollar as legal tender with the United States dollar legal tender.

== Half Pounds ==
In adopting the Jamaican dollar, Jamaica followed the pattern of South Africa, Australia, and New Zealand in that when it adopted the decimal system, it decided to use the half-pound unit as opposed to the pound unit of account. The choice of the name dollar was motivated by the fact that the reduced value of the new unit corresponded more closely to the value of the US dollar than it did to pound sterling.

== See also ==
- Bahamian dollar
- Central banks and currencies of the Caribbean
- Economy of Jamaica
