= Cayman Islands Hospital =

- Cayman Islands Health Services Authority

Geography
- Location: 95 Hospital Road, George Town, Grand Cayman, Cayman Islands
- Coordinates: 19.2895°N 81.3804°W

Services
- Emergency department: Yes
- Beds: 124

History
- Opened: 1999

Links
- Website: www.hsa.ky/cayman-islands-hospital

The Cayman Islands Hospital, also known locally as the George Town Hospital (GT Hospital), is the principal government hospital in the Cayman Islands, located in George Town on Grand Cayman. It is run by the Cayman Islands Health Services Authority.

== History ==
The hospital was completed in 1999.

== Facilities ==
The hospital is a two-storey facility with 124 beds and four operating theatres. Other facilities include an accident and emergency department, critical care unit, dialysis unit, pharmacy, laboratory and forensic unit.

== Services ==
The hospital provides services in most medical specialities.
