= List of countries by industrial production growth rate =

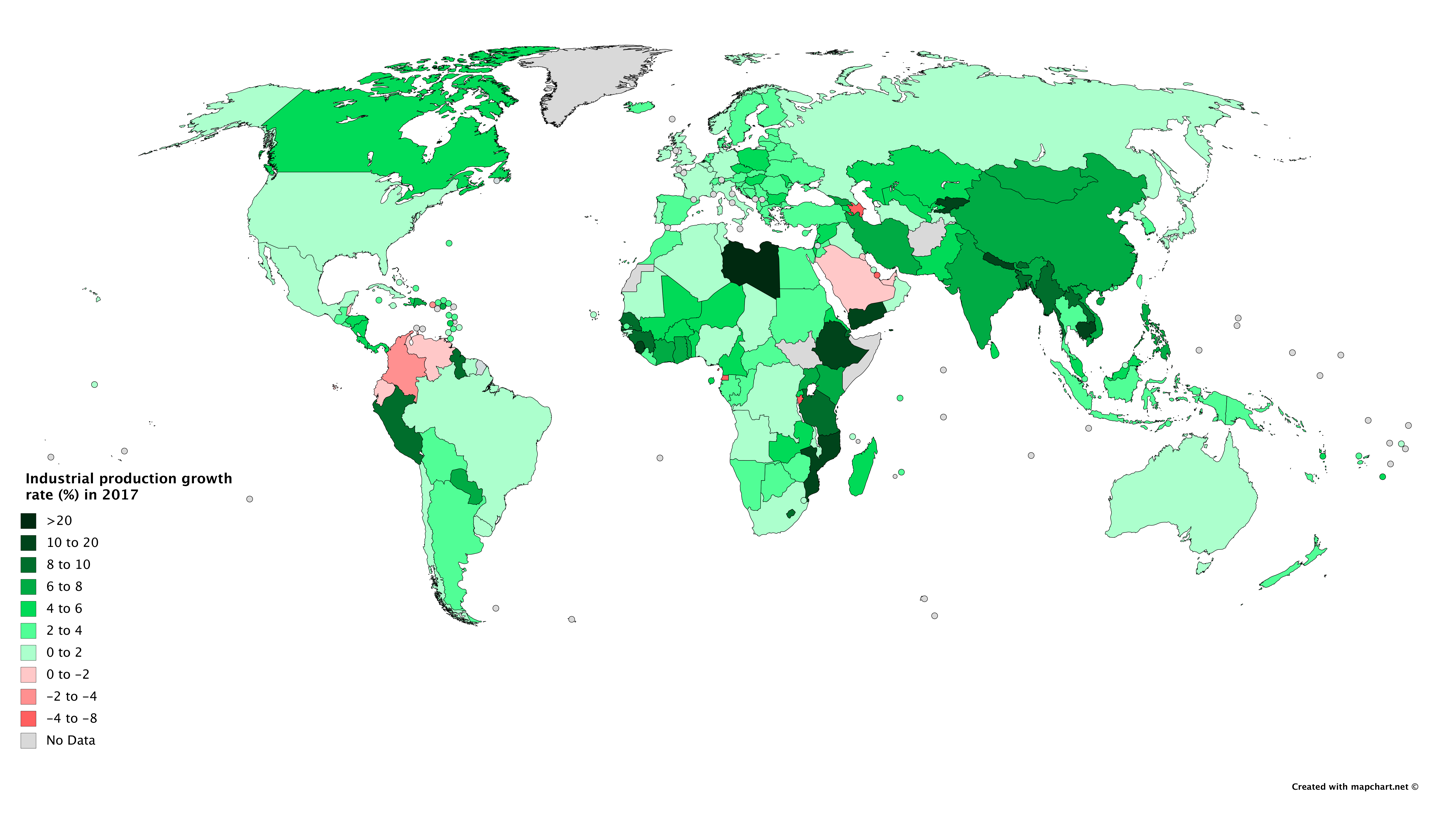
A colour−coded map showing countries or territories by industrial production growth rate in 2017 in percentages, based on data from The World Factbook. Countries or territories without data or with data from earlier than 2017 are shown in grey.

This is a list of countries by industrial production growth rate mostly based on The World Factbook, as of September 2025.

Country	Industrial production growth rate (%)	Date
Guyana	53.3	2024
Senegal	20.0	2024
Bahamas	12.5	2024
Niger	12.1	2024
Denmark	12.0	2024
Sri Lanka	11.0	2024
San Marino	10.7	2022
DR Congo	10.1	2024
Rwanda	10.0	2024
Tajikistan	9.9	2023
Central African Republic	9.7	2024
Djibouti	9.7	2024
Benin	9.7	2024
Cambodia	9.5	2024
Kyrgyzstan	9.4	2024
Ethiopia	9.2	2024
Turks and Caicos Islands	9.0	2024
Dominica	8.8	2024
Vietnam	8.2	2024
Guinea-Bissau	8.0	2024
Saint Vincent and the Grenadines	7.3	2024
Fiji	7.3	2024
Uzbekistan	7.2	2024
Guinea	7.1	2024
Ghana	7.1	2024
Macau	6.8	2023
Kazakhstan	6.6	2024
Mongolia	6.5	2024
Armenia	6.2	2024
Greece	6.1	2024
Liberia	6.1	2024
Andorra	6.0	2024
Belarus	6.0	2024
Brunei	5.7	2024
India	5.6	2024
Saint Lucia	5.6	2024
Philippines	5.6	2024
Malta	5.6	2024
Georgia	5.4	2024
China	5.3	2024
Tanzania	5.2	2024
Indonesia	5.2	2024
Chad	5.1	2024
Angola	5.0	2024
Morocco	5.0	2024
Uganda	4.9	2024
Malaysia	4.9	2024
Belize	4.8	2024
Sierra Leone	4.7	2024
Solomon Islands	4.7	2022
Mauritius	4.7	2024
Cyprus	4.6	2024
Uruguay	4.4	2024
Cape Verde	4.4	2024
Togo	4.2	2024
Singapore	4.2	2024
Samoa	4.2	2024
Russia	4.1	2024
Ukraine	4.1	2024
Costa Rica	4.1	2024
Kosovo	4.0	2024
Laos	3.9	2024
Algeria	3.9	2023
Comoros	3.8	2024
Jordan	3.7	2024
Madagascar	3.7	2024
Papua New Guinea	3.6	2024
Nicaragua	3.6	2024
Bangladesh	3.5	2024
Chile	3.5	2024
Zambia	3.5	2024
Cayman Islands	3.4	2022
Hong Kong	3.4	2024
Moldova	3.3	2024
Brazil	3.3	2024
United States	3.3	2021
Lithuania	3.2	2024
Sao Tome and Principe	3.2	2024
Peru	3.1	2024
Dominican Republic	3.0	2024
Mozambique	2.9	2024
Serbia	2.9	2024
Grenada	2.9	2024
Mauritania	2.8	2024
Gabon	2.8	2024
Cote d'Ivoire	2.8	2024
Iran	2.8	2024
Zimbabwe	2.7	2024
Spain	2.6	2024
Lesotho	2.6	2024
Norway	2.4	2024
Gambia	2.4	2024
Nigeria	2.4	2024
Turkey	2.2	2024
Paraguay	2.2	2024
Azerbaijan	2.1	2024
Suriname	2.1	2023
Malawi	2.1	2024
Croatia	2.1	2024
Guatemala	2.0	2024
Cameroon	1.9	2024
Bulgaria	1.9	2024
North Macedonia	1.8	2024
Afghanistan	1.8	2023
Slovenia	1.8	2024
Switzerland	1.7	2024
Qatar	1.6	2024
Japan	1.4	2023
Guernsey	1.3	2023
Jersey	1.3	2023
Portugal	1.2	2024
Bolivia	1.1	2023
South Korea	1.1	2023
Antigua and Barbuda	1.0	2023
Namibia	1.0	2024
Thailand	0.9	2024
Honduras	0.8	2024
Micronesia	0.8	2023
United Arab Emirates	0.8	2023
Equatorial Guinea	0.8	2024
France	0.7	2024
Eswatini	0.5	2023
Sint Maarten	0.5	2021
Australia	0.5	2024
El Salvador	0.4	2024
Sweden	0.3	2024
Slovakia	0.3	2024
Congo	0.3	2024
Kenya	0.2	2024
Italy	0.2	2024
Mexico	0.2	2024
Oman	0.2	2024
Bahrain	0.1	2023
Nepal	0.1	2024
Lebanon	0.1	2023
Canada	0.0	2024
Bhutan	0.0	2023
Myanmar	−0.2	2024
Burundi	−0.2	2024
Albania	−0.2	2024
South Africa	−0.4	2024
United Kingdom	−0.5	2024
Belgium	−0.6	2024
Poland	−0.6	2023
Romania	−0.9	2024
Cuba	−0.9	2023
New Zealand	−1.0	2023
Czechia	−1.0	2024
Luxembourg	−1.1	2024
Yemen	−1.1	2018
Greenland	−1.3	2023
Barbados	−1.3	2023
Saudi Arabia	−1.3	2024
Colombia	−1.3	2024
Netherlands	−1.5	2024
Jamaica	−1.5	2024
Pakistan	−1.7	2024
Montenegro	−1.7	2024
Egypt	−1.9	2024
Finland	−2.2	2024
Iceland	−2.3	2024
Mali	−2.4	2024
Bosnia and Herzegovina	−2.4	2024
Tunisia	−2.5	2024
Hungary	−2.5	2024
Panama	−2.6	2024
Maldives	−2.7	2024
Iraq	−2.7	2024
Saint Kitts and Nevis	−2.7	2024
Marshall Islands	−2.8	2023
Germany	−3.0	2024
Bermuda	−3.6	2023
Ecuador	−3.7	2024
Latvia	−4.0	2024
Israel	−4.2	2024
Trinidad and Tobago	−4.7	2023
Haiti	−4.7	2024
Ireland	−4.9	2024
Kuwait	−5.2	2024
Burkina Faso	−5.4	2024
Austria	−5.5	2024
Libya	−5.8	2024
Kiribati	−6.2	2022
Seychelles	−6.4	2024
Estonia	−7.0	2024
Argentina	−7.2	2024
Tonga	−11.1	2023
Sudan	−13.1	2024
Syria	−13.4	2022
Botswana	−13.5	2024
Palau	−19.5	2023
Vanuatu	−19.7	2022
Isle of Man	−29.5	2022
West Bank	−32.2	2024
Gaza Strip	−32.2	2024
South Sudan	−36.8	2015
Timor-Leste	−57.0	2023
