= List of Latin American countries by population =

This is a list of Latin American countries and dependent territories by population, which is sorted by the 2015 mid-year normalized demographic projections.

== Table ==
Rank	Country (or dependent territory)	July 1, 2015 projection	% of pop.	Average relative annual growth (%)	Average absolute annual growth	Estimated doubling time (Years)	Official figure (where available)	Date of last figure	Source
1	Brazil	204,519,000	33.13	0.86	1,750,000	81	212,457,615	October 25, 2026	Official population clock
2	Mexico	127,500,000	19.60	1.08	1,293,000	65	127,792,286	July 1, 2020	Official estimate
3	Colombia	48,218,000	7.81	1.16	555,000	60	54,234,000	October 25, 2026	Official population clock
4	Argentina	43,132,000	6.99	1.09	463,000	64	45,376,763	July 1, 2020	Official estimate
5	Peru	33,050,325	5.05	1.10	338,000	64	32,625,948	July 1, 2020	Official estimate
6	Venezuela	30,620,000	4.96	1.37	414,000	51	28,435,943	2020	Official estimate
7	Chile	18,006,000	2.92	1.05	187,000	66	19,458,310	2020	Official estimate
8	Ecuador	16,279,000	2.64	1.57	252,000	44	19,163,300	October 25, 2026	Official population clock
9	Guatemala	16,176,000	2.62	2.93	461,000	24	16,858,333	July 1, 2020	Official estimate
10	Cuba	11,252,000	1.82	0.25	28,000	278	11,193,470	December 31, 2019	Official estimate
11	Bolivia	10,520,000	1.70	1.73	179,000	40	11,633,371	2020	Official estimate
12	Dominican Republic	9,980,000	1.62	0.98	97,000	71	10,448,499	2020	Official estimate
13	Honduras	8,950,000	1.45	2.29	200,000	31	9,304,380	July 1, 2020	Official estimate
14	Paraguay	7,003,000	1.13	1.58	109,000	44	7,252,672	2020	Official estimate
15	Nicaragua	6,514,000	1.06	2.37	151,000	30	6,527,691	June 30, 2019	Official estimate
16	El Salvador	6,460,000	1.05	0.92	59,000	76	6,765,753	2020	Official estimate
17	Costa Rica	4,851,000	0.79	1.63	78,000	43	5,111,238	June 30, 2020	Official estimate
18	Panama	3,764,000	0.61	1.37	51,000	51	4,278,500	July 1, 2020	Official estimate
19	Puerto Rico (US)	3,508,000	0.57	-1.13	-40,000	-	3,193,694	July 1, 2019	Official estimate
20	Uruguay	3,310,000	0.54	0.18	6,000	382	3,530,912	June 30, 2020	Official estimate
—	Total	606,317,000	100.00	1.13	6,637,000	62			
