= List of Latin American and Caribbean countries by GDP (nominal) =

This is a list of Latin American and Caribbean countries by gross domestic product (nominal) in USD according to the International Monetary Fund (IMF)'s estimates in April 2026 World Economic Outlook database.

Cuba is not included in the list due to lack of current or accurate economic data. Puerto Rico is not listed since it is a U.S. territory, and neither is the Falkland Islands since it is a British Overseas Territory. Several others are in this category including Dutch, British, French, and American territories. There are about 33 countries and 15 territories in these two regions.

Latin America and the Caribbean by estimated GDP 2026 (nominal)
Rank	Country	GDP (nominal) (millions of US$)	GDP (nominal) per capita (US$)
1	Brazil	2,635,912	12,313
2	Mexico	2,120,855	15,779
3	Argentina	688,378	14,357
4	Colombia	539,530	10,104
5	Chile	407,850	20,240
6	Peru	380,900	10,960
7	Ecuador	138,194	7,575
8	Dominican Republic	136,148	12,406
9	Guatemala	128,886	6,810
10	Venezuela	111,303	4,140
11	Costa Rica	109,931	20,299
12	Uruguay	96,092	27,608
13	Panama	95,024	20,564
14	Bolivia	80,743	6,333
15	Paraguay	60,542	9,372
16	Honduras	41,505	3,711
17	El Salvador	39,838	6,196
19	Haiti	39,180	3,079
18	Guyana	33,961	33,167
20	Trinidad and Tobago	26,836	18,616
21	Nicaragua	24,227	3,559
22	Jamaica	23,028	8,356
23	The Bahamas	17,042	40,892
24	Barbados	8,483	29,020
25	Suriname	5,908	8,856
26	Belize	3,450	8,134
27	Saint Lucia	2,765	15,135
28	Antigua and Barbuda	2,385	22,448
29	Grenada	1,483	12,689
30	Saint Vincent and the Grenadines	1,236	11,098
31	Saint Kitts and Nevis	1,143	22,146
32	Dominica	791	10,459

== See also ==
- Community of Latin American and Caribbean States
- List of Latin American and Caribbean countries by GDP (PPP)
- List of Latin American and Caribbean countries by GDP growth
