= List of Latin American and Caribbean countries by GDP (PPP) =

This is a list of Latin American and the Caribbean countries by gross domestic product at purchasing power parity in international dollars according to the International Monetary Fund's estimates in the April 2025 World Economic Outlook database.

The Latin American countries Brazil, Mexico, Argentina, Colombia, and Chile are the region's largest economies by gross domestic product (GDP) at purchasing power parity (PPP).

Cuba is not included in the list due to lack of economic data.

Of the countries listed, some are not independent: Aruba is a constituent country of the Kingdom of the Netherlands, and Puerto Rico is a United States territory with special status and thus is measured separately from the U.S. by the World Economic Outlook.

== List ==
Latin American and the Caribbean nations by estimated GDP (PPP) for 2025
Rank	Nation	GDP (PPP) in International Dollars	
Rank	Nation	Total (millions)	Per capita
1	Brazil	4,958,122	23,238
2	Mexico	3,395,916	25,462
3	Argentina	1,493,423	31,379
4	Colombia	1,190,795	22,421
5	Chile	710,195	35,146
6	Peru	643,052	18,688
7	Dominican Republic	336,082	30,874
8	Ecuador	300,122	16,578
9	Guatemala	282,833	15,633
10	Venezuela	223,984	8,397
11	Panama	200,150	43,839
12	Costa Rica	169,034	31,462
13	Bolivia	144,098	11,574
14	Paraguay	136,441	19,571
15	Puerto Rico	163,490	51,490
16	Uruguay	130,209	37,060
17	El Salvador	88,282	13,746
18	Honduras	85,984	7,927
19	Guyana	75,294	94,258
20	Nicaragua	63,810	9,106
21	Trinidad and Tobago	43,658	30,719
22	Haiti	38,952	3,186
23	Jamaica	35,690	12,995
24	Bahamas	18,146	44,950
25	Suriname	11,435	18,311
26	Aruba (Kingdom of the Netherlands)	5,502	51,352
27	Barbados	5,436	18,738
28	Belize	5,032	11,166
29	Saint Lucia	3,452	18,973
30	Antigua and Barbuda	2,601	25,449
31	Grenada	2,307	20,195
32	Saint Vincent and the Grenadines	1,980	17,840
33	Saint Kitts and Nevis	1,760	29,893
34	Dominica	1,069	14,348
Total		12,813,893	20,034
