= List of Caribbean-related topics =

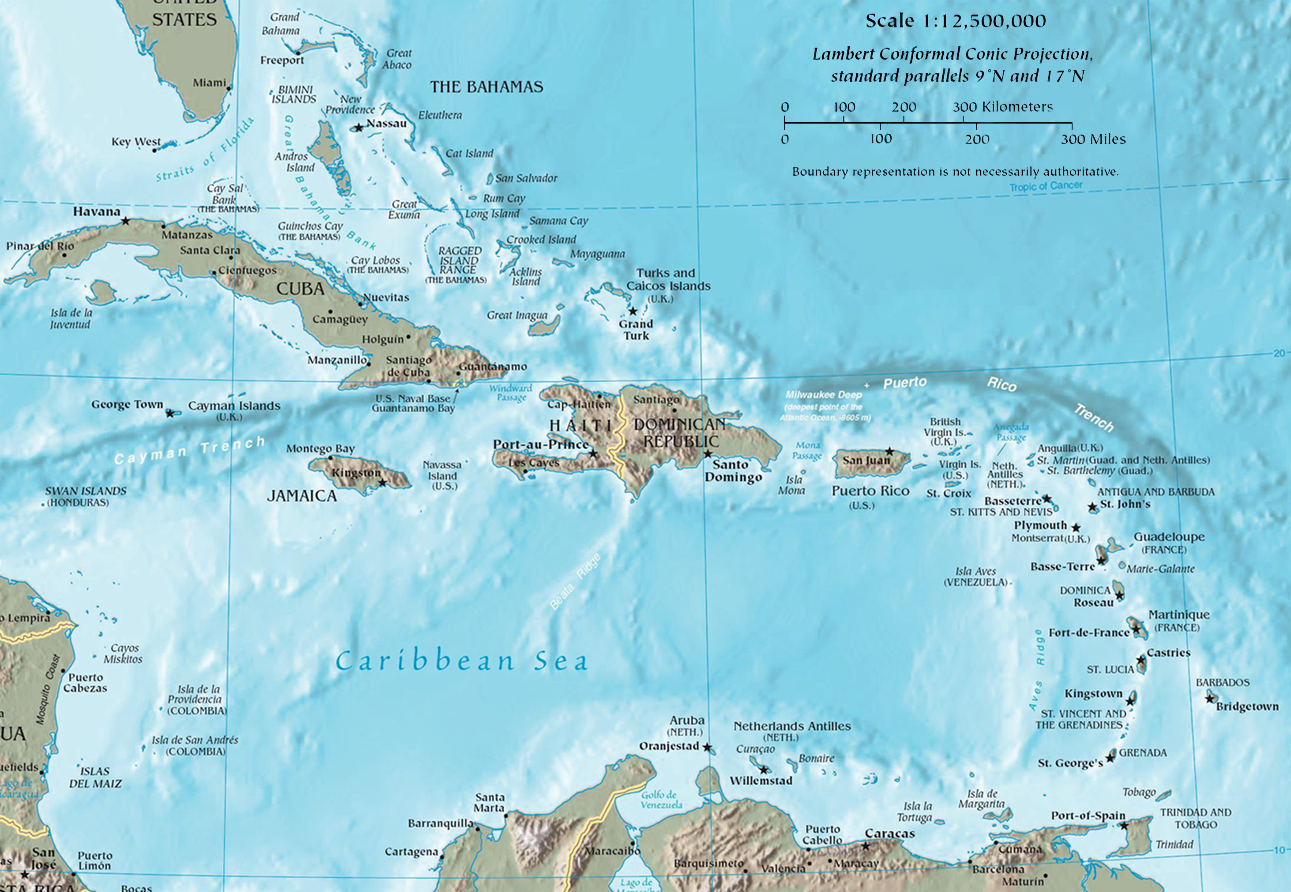

This is a outline of topics related to the Caribbean region. Links to outlines and indexes of countries in the Caribbean region are also provided. The Caribbean (/ˌkærɪˈbiːən, kəˈrɪbiən/, locally /ˈkærɪbiæn/; Spanish: Caribe; French: Caraïbes; Haitian Creole: Karayib; also Antillean Creole: Kawayib; Dutch: Caraïben; Papiamento: Karibe) is a region of the Americas that comprises the Caribbean Sea, its surrounding coasts, and its islands (some of which lie within the Caribbean Sea and some of which lie on the edge of the Caribbean Sea where it borders the North Atlantic Ocean). The region lies southeast of the Gulf of Mexico and of the North American mainland, east of Central America, and north of South America.

== Caribbean topic outline ==
=== History ===
History of the Caribbean and West Indies:

- Spanish Caribbean (1492–1898)
- Piracy in the Caribbean (1500s–1830)
- Dutch Caribbean (1554–1863)
- British Caribbean (1586–1834)
- French Caribbean (1625–1817)
- Baltic-German Caribbean (1654-1689)
- Danish Caribbean (1672–1917)
- German Caribbean (1685-1693)
- Swedish Caribbean (1784–1878)
- History of the British West Indies
- Amelioration Act 1798
- Bishoprics, etc., in West Indies Act 1842
- British West Indian labour unrest of 1934–1939
- Battle of the Caribbean (1941-1945, World War II)

Historic topics:

- Afro-Caribbean
- Atlantic triangular slave-trade
- Caribbean Court of Justice
- Emancipation of the British West Indies
  - Enslavement
- Energy and Climate Partnership of the Americas
- German interest in the Caribbean
- Good Neighbor policy
- Impact of hurricanes on Caribbean history
- Influx of diseases
  - Malaria
  - COVID-19
- Monroe Doctrine
- Partnership for Prosperity and Security in the Caribbean
- Pre-Columbian trans-oceanic contact theories
- Territorial evolution
- Third Border Initiative
- West Indian Brigade
- West India Regiment

=== Geography and Geology ===
Geography and Geology

- Antilles
  - Greater Antilles
  - Lesser Antilles
    - Leeward Islands
    - British Leeward Islands
    - Leeward Antilles
    - Windward Islands
- Caribbean Basin
- Caribbean Lowlands
- Caribbean Plate
- Caribbean Sea
- Caribbean South America
- Gulf of Honduras
- Latin America and the Caribbean
- Western Caribbean zone

Geographic and geologic topics:

- Bioregion
  - Caribbean Initiative
  - Mammals
    - Caribbean monk seal
    - List of bats of the Caribbean by island
    - List of eulipotyphlans of the Caribbean
    - Pilosans of the Caribbean
    - Rodents of the Caribbean
  - Sealife
    - Caribbean hermit crab
    - Caribbean Queen Conch
    - Caribbean reef octopus
    - Caribbean reef shark
    - Caribbean sculptured sea catfish
    - West Indian manatee
  - Trees
    - Caribbean pine
- Caribbean large igneous province
- Earthquakes
- Extreme points
- Islands (by area)
- Metropolitan areas
- Mountains
- Rivers
- Ultras
- Sovereign states
- Dependent territories
- World Heritage Sites

=== Politics ===
Politics of the Caribbean region:

- Afro-Caribbean leftism
- Association of Caribbean States
- Caribbean Community
- Caribbean Legion
- CARIFORUM
- Coat of arms of the British Windward Islands
- Foreign relations
  - Canada–Caribbean relations
  - Caribbean–China relations
- Organisation of African, Caribbean and Pacific States
- Organisation of Eastern Caribbean States
- Pan-Caribbean Congress
- West Indies Federation
  - West Indies Associated States
  - Governor-General of the West Indies Federation
  - West Indies Democratic Labour Party
  - Democratic Labour Party (West Indies Federation)
  - West Indies Federal Labour Party

=== Economy ===
Economy of the Caribbean:

- Airlines
  - Caribbean Airline Pilots Association
- Airports
- Anchor coinage
- Caribbean Basin Trade and Partnership Act
- Caribbean Basin Initiative
- Caribbean Basin Trade and Partnership Act
- Caribbean Basin Trade Partnership Act
- Caribbean Regional Maritime Agreement
- Currencies of the British West Indies
  - British West Indies dollar
- Caribbean Broadcasting Corporation (Barbados)
- Caribbean Cinemas
- Caribbean Development Bank
- Caribbean Free Trade Association
- Central banks and currencies
- Citrus industry
- Companies
- Fishing industry
- Grog
- Latin American and Caribbean Economic Association
- Hotels in the Caribbean
- Postage stamps and postal history of the Leeward Islands
- Rum producers
- Stock exchanges in the Americas
  - Eastern Caribbean Securities Exchange
- Sugar plantations
  - Cuban sugar economy
  - Sugar production in the Danish West Indies
- Tourism
  - Caribbean Tourism Organization

=== Demographics ===
Demographics of the Caribbean

- Languages
  - Dutch
  - English
  - French
  - Hindustani
  - Spanish
  - Other
  - Pre-Arawakan
- List of populated places in the Caribbean
- Countries by population
- Religions

=== Culture ===
Culture of the Caribbean:

- Actors
- Architecture
  - Antonin Nechodoma (Prairie style)
- Art
  - Art schools
  - The Caribbean Artists Movement
  - Caribbean Festival of Arts
  - English Caribbean arts
  - Dutch Caribbean arts
  - French Caribbean arts
  - Spanish-Caribbean Arts
  - Artists
- Caribbean people
  - Afro-Caribbean people
  - Asian Caribbean
  - British African-Caribbean people
  - British Indo-Caribbean people
  - Caribbean Brazilians
  - Caribbean region of Colombia
  - Creole people of the Caribbean
  - Eastern Caribbean people
  - Indo-Caribbean
  - West Indian
  - White Caribbean
  - Women in the Caribbean
- Carnivals
- Crafts
  - Paper craft
  - Periagua (dugout)
- Cuisine
  - Beer
  - Jerk (cooking)
  - Pelau
  - Rice and peas
  - Rum
  - Rum cake
- Dancers
  - Ring shout
- Feminism in the Caribbean
  - Caribbean Association for Feminist Research and Action
- Film
  - Cinema of the Caribbean
  - List of Caribbean films
- Literature
  - Caribbean folklore
  - Caribbean Voices
  - Small Axe Project
- Music
  - Calypso music
  - Concert Halls
  - Folk music
  - Lesser Antilles music
  - Musicians
- Painting
- Picong (banter)
- Poetry
- Quadrille dress
- Radio stations
- Scout Jamboree
- Sculptors
- Sport
  - British West Indies at the 1960 Summer Olympics
  - Caribbean Football Union
  - Central American and Caribbean Games
  - Central American and Caribbean Junior Championships in Athletics
  - Cricket in the West Indies
  - West Indian cricket team
  - West Indies women's cricket team
  - West Indies national football team
  - West Indies national rugby league team
- Stadiums
- Television stations
  - Caribbean's Next Top Model
  - ESPN Caribbean
  - Tempo Networks
- Theatre
- Universities and educational associations
  - Association of Caribbean University, Research and Institutional Libraries
  - American University of the Caribbean (Sint Maarten)
  - Caribbean Philosophical Association
  - Caribbean University (Puerto Rico)
  - International University of the Caribbean
  - Medical schools
    - Caribbean Medical University
  - University of the Southern Caribbean (Trinidad and Tobago)
  - University of the West Indies

=== Indigenous peoples of the Caribbean ===
Indigenous peoples:

- List of Caribbean indigenous peoples
- Taíno (Indigenous peoples of the Bahamas)
  - List of Taínos
  - Taino archaeology
- Arawak
  - Arawakan languages
- Kalinago (Carib people)
- Indigenous Caribbean Visual Arts
- Indigenous Caribbean people
- Indigenous peoples of the Americas
- Indigenous Names of the Eastern Caribbean islands

=== Related topics ===
Other general topics about or relating to the Caribbean not included above:

- Caribbean South America (Colombia, Venezuela, and the Guiannas)
- Bocas del Toro Creole (Panama)
- European colonization of the Americas
- Exploration by Christopher Columbus
- First wave of European colonization
- History of colonialism
- Miskito Coastal Creole (Nicaragua)
- San Andrés-Providencia Creole (Colombia)
- Territories of the United States (including those in the Caribbean)
- United Nations Economic Commission for Latin America and the Caribbean

=== Countries and territories in the Caribbean region ===
Island nations of the Caribbean
| Country/territory | Outline | Index |
|---|---|---|
| Anguilla | Outline of Anguilla | Index of Anguilla-related articles |
| Antigua and Barbuda | Outline of Antigua and Barbuda | Index of Antigua and Barbuda–related articles |
| Aruba | Outline of Aruba | Index of Aruba-related articles |
| Bahamas | Outline of the Bahamas | Index of the Bahamas-related articles |
| Barbados | Outline of Barbados | Index of Barbados-related articles |
| Belize | Outline of Belize | Index of Belize-related articles |
| Caribbean Netherlands Bonaire | | |
| British Virgin Islands | Outline of British Virgin Islands | Index of British Virgin Islands-related articles |
| Cayman Islands | Outline of Cayman Islands | Index of Cayman Islands–related articles |
| Cuba | Outline of Cuba | Index of Cuba-related articles |
| Curaçao | Outline of Curaçao | Index of Curaçao-related articles |
| Dominica | Outline of Dominica | Index of Dominica-related articles |
| Dominican Republic | Outline of Dominican Republic | Index of Dominican Republic–related articles |
| Venezuela Federal Dependencies of Venezuela | | |
| Grenada | Outline of Grenada | Index of Grenada-related articles |
| Guadeloupe | Outline of Guadeloupe | Index of Guadeloupe-related articles |
| Haiti | Outline of Haiti | Index of Haiti-related articles |
| Jamaica | Outline of Jamaica | Index of Jamaica-related articles |
| Martinique | Outline of Martinique | Index of Martinique-related articles |
| Montserrat | Outline of Montserrat | Index of Montserrat-related articles |
| (United States) Navassa Island | Outline of Navassa Island | Index of Navassa Island-related articles |
| Venezuela Nueva Esparta | | |
| Puerto Rico | Outline of Puerto Rico | Index of Puerto Rico–related articles |
| Caribbean Netherlands Saba | | |
| Colombia San Andrés and Providencia | | |
| Saint Barthélemy | Outline of Saint Barthélemy | Index of Saint Barthélemy–related articles |
| Saint Kitts and Nevis | Outline of Saint Kitts and Nevis | Index of Saint Kitts and Nevis–related articles |
| Saint Lucia | Outline of Saint Lucia | Index of Saint Lucia–related articles |
| Saint Martin | Outline of Saint Martin | Index of Saint Martin–related articles |
| Caribbean Netherlands Sint Eustatius | | |
| Sint Maarten | Outline of the Netherlands Antilles | Index of the Netherlands Antilles–related articles |
| Saint Vincent and the Grenadines | Outline of Saint Vincent and the Grenadines | Index of Saint Vincent and the Grenadines–related articles |
| Trinidad and Tobago | Outline of Trinidad and Tobago | Index of Trinidad and Tobago–related articles |
| Turks and Caicos Islands | Outline of Turks and Caicos Islands | Index of Turks and Caicos Islands–related articles |
| United States Virgin Islands | Outline of United States Virgin Islands | Index of United States Virgin Islands–related articles |

Continental nations surrounding the Caribbean Sea include:

- Colombia
- Costa Rica
- Guatemala
- Honduras
- Mexico
- Nicaragua
- Panama
- Venezuela

== See also ==
- fr:Caraïbes
- es:Caribe (región)
- Anglo-America
- Latin American culture
- Latin America
- Index of Central America-related articles
- Lists of country-related topics
- Outline of North America
- Outline of South America
