= Human trafficking in the Bahamas =

The Bahamas ratified the 2000 UN TIP Protocol in September 2008.

== Background in 2010 ==
In 2010, the Bahamas was a destination country for men and some women from Haiti and other Caribbean countries who were subjected to trafficking in persons, specifically forced labor, and, to a lesser extent, women from Jamaica and other countries who were in forced prostitution. Haitian trafficking victims were most likely to migrate to The Bahamas voluntarily, but subsequently be subjected to forced labor in agriculture, domestic service, or forced prostitution. Some employers coerce migrant workers - legal and illegal - to work longer hours, at lower pay, and in conditions not permitted under local labor law by changing the terms of employment contracts, withholding travel documents, refusing transportation back home, threatening to withdraw the employer-specific and employer-held permits, or threatening to have the employee deported through other means. Traffickers reportedly lured Jamaican and other foreign women to the Bahamas with offers of employment in the tourism and entertainment fields and subjected the women to forced prostitution after their arrival. The Ministry of Education investigated allegations that some high school girls in Eleuthera may have been involved in a prostitution ring. This report was the only indication that Bahamian citizens may have been victims of human trafficking.

According to the U.S. government, the Government of the Bahamas did not fully comply with the minimum standards for the elimination of trafficking; however, it made significant efforts to do so. Throughout the year, the government began some investigations into suspected cases of trafficking but did not proactively identify victims among vulnerable populations, such as women and girls engaged in prostitution, and it continued to deport undocumented migrants without first determining whether they may be victims of trafficking.

The U.S. State Department's Office to Monitor and Combat Trafficking in Persons placed the country in "Tier 1" in 2017.

In 2020, the Bahamas received its Tier 1 ranking for the sixth consecutive year. This Confirming that the Bahamas meets the minimum standards for eliminating human trafficking. Nevertheless, the Foreign Ministry criticizes that courts work slowly, convictions of human traffickers are few and far between and that the funds for victim support have decreased. In 2019, 16 suspected traffickers were investigated, 11 investigations for sex trafficking and five for labour trafficking. Five women were identified as victims of trafficking. Money for the care and prevention of trafficking victims has been reduced (from $125,710 in 2018) to $95,000, which is attributed to the aftermath of Hurricane Dorian.

The country remained at Tier 1 at 2023.

== Prosecution ==
The Government of The Bahamas demonstrated minimal anti-human trafficking law enforcement efforts during the reporting period. It continued to face relevant resource and capacity constraints, and confronted multiple competing law enforcement priorities. All forms of trafficking are prohibited through the Trafficking in Persons Prevention and Suppression Act of 2008. Penalties prescribed by the Act for trafficking in persons offenses range from three years to life imprisonment, and are sufficiently stringent and commensurate with penalties prescribed for other serious crimes, such as rape. The government did not arrest or prosecute any trafficking offenders, despite reports of the presence of trafficking victims in The Bahamas since at least 2005. During the reporting period, the government began investigating one suspected trafficking case in cooperation with another government. The Ministry of Education formed a task force to investigate allegations of a student prostitution ring at a high school in Eleuthera. NGOs, in partnership with the Bahamian government, provided immigration, labor, social services, and law enforcement personnel with anti-trafficking training. Historically, government personnel have conflated human trafficking and human smuggling, leading to the routine deportation of foreigners in vulnerable populations without determining whether they may be trafficking victims. Although the practice continued to some extent, automatic deportations have decreased as official awareness of trafficking as a form of transnational crime has increased. Anecdotal reports indicate that during 2009 some military personnel may have been involved in assisting with the illegal entry of trafficking victims into the country. There is no evidence of government involvement in or tolerance of trafficking. In 2014 the first person was convicted of trafficking in the Bahamas.

== Protection ==
The Bahamian government showed minimal efforts to protect victims of trafficking over the last year. Although the Ministry of Labor and Social Development’s Bureau of Women’s Affairs became the lead agency for anti-trafficking training and assistance to victims, the government continued to rely on NGOs and international organizations to identify and provide most services to victims. No specialized shelters for trafficking victims were available in the Bahamas. Shelter services, counseling, and law enforcement referrals were accessible to women and child trafficking victims through the Crisis Centre, which focuses on assisting victims of sexual and domestic abuse. The Red Cross, the Salvation Army, and local church groups which provide assistance to illegal migrants could assist foreign men who may be victims of labor trafficking. Assistance providers did not knowingly assist any trafficking victims during the reporting period. Officials followed no formal procedures for screening or referring victims to service providers. The government has developed but has not yet implemented a plan to refer victims to the Bureau of Women’s Affairs, the Crisis Centre, and the Eugene Dupuch Law School. During the year, the government arranged for the International Organization for Migration (IOM) to conduct victim assistance training for immigration, labor, social services, law enforcement and NGO participants. The ministers responsible for national security and social services, however, did not develop or implement a plan to provide appropriate services to victims in cooperation with NGOs, as required by the anti-trafficking law of 2008. Although the government ensured that victims brought to its attention were not inappropriately penalized for immigration violations and any unlawful acts committed as a direct result of being trafficked, some victims were not properly identified. No formal procedures exist that allow law enforcement officers time to investigate whether foreign women found engaging in prostitution may be victims of sex trafficking before the law requires that they be deported. As more immigration and police officers received training in trafficking issues throughout the year, however, the number of officers who first attempted to determine whether foreign women found engaging in prostitution could be victims of trafficking before considering them eligible for deportation increased. The Bahamas’ law encourages victims to participate in investigations and prosecutions of trafficking offenders, and includes provisions for victims’ immunity from prosecution, the protection of victims and witnesses with special considerations for the age and extent of trauma suffered by the victim, and relief from the removal of foreign victims to countries where they may face hardship or retribution regardless of their participation in the investigation or prosecution of their traffickers. Under this law, traffickers are required to financially compensate their victims.

== Prevention ==
In 2012, the government established the Task Force on Trafficking in Human Beings to work on the prevention, detection and prosecution of human trafficking. A Special Prosecutor's Office for Human Trafficking has been established to cooperate with the Task Force.

The government demonstrated some efforts to prevent trafficking over the reporting period. The government participated in information and education campaigns conducted in partnership with organizations such as IOM. An ad hoc governmental working group of the Ministry of Foreign Affairs, Department of Immigration, the Ministry of Labor and Social Development’s Bureau of Women’s Affairs, and NGO representatives met periodically to address and coordinate trafficking issues among the various government ministries. This group shifted its focus from immigration enforcement to an emphasis on victim outreach and punishment of perpetrators over the last year. To address the vulnerability of some migrant workers to labor exploitation, the government expedited the processing of immigration claims and granted citizenship to certain long-time residents. The government made no visible effort to reduce the demand for commercial sex acts.
