= Economy of the Caribbean =

The 'Economy of the Caribbean' is varied, but depends heavily on natural resources, agriculture and travel and tourism.

== Main trading partners ==
Country	Leading export market	Leading import source
Antigua and Barbuda	United States	United States
Bahamas	United States	United States
Barbados	United States	United States
Belize	European Union	United States
Cuba	Russia	China
Dominica	Trinidad and Tobago	United States
Dominican Republic	United States	United States
Grenada	Dominica	United States
Guyana	Canada	Trinidad and Tobago
Haiti	United States	United States
Jamaica	United States	United States
Saint Kitts and Nevis	United States	United States
Saint Lucia	United States	United States
Saint Vincent and the Grenadines	Barbados	United States
Suriname	United States	United States
Trinidad and Tobago	United States	United States

== Natural resources ==
By international standards, minerals most valuable on the international market are found in Cuba, Jamaica, and Trinidad and Tobago. Several nations of the Caribbean are rich in natural resources; including Trinidad's vast natural gas and oil reserves, Jamaican bauxite and most recently the discovery of a large oil field in Guyana. The resources that make significant contributions to domestic economies and regional job sectors include fisheries, agriculture, forestry, mining and oil and gas bauxite, iron, nickel, petroleum and timber, among others. It has been noted by some that the Caribbean's most important resource is its tropical island setting, which has generated an important tourism sector. The attention by regional governments towards economic diversification in the early 1990s is often associated with increased production in tourism, oil, and nickel, spurred by foreign investment in these primary industries.

== Agriculture ==
Along with contributing to the Caribbean's GDP, agriculture also contributes to domestic food supply and provides employment. While agriculture is the major economic land-use activity in many Caribbean countries, agriculture accounts for a declining percentage of most islands' GDP. However, unlike many developed countries, this trend may be accounted for by a growing tertiary sector, as opposed to industrial growth, except for Trinidad and Tobago and Mexico. Associations representing the agricultural industry in the region include the Caribbean Food Crop Society (CFCS) and the Windward Islands Farmers Association (WINFA). Some in Saint Vincent represent the interests of FairTrade certified producers and in Saint Vincent, Saint Lucia, Dominica and Grenada.

== Globalization: challenges and prospects ==
While globalization in its modern context undoubtedly has changed the dynamic of Caribbean economics, “the countries of the commonwealth have been passively integrated into the international economy for all of their modern history”. From foundations built on the plantation economy, the Caribbean economy has always involved reliance on one or several export sectors. While numerous attempts at market diversification have been made, the struggle to develop the political and economic infrastructure necessary to successfully respond to market fluctuations, and loss of competitiveness, in key export sectors remains a struggle. A recent example includes the dismantling of the Lomé Convention, which provided Caribbean Banana exports preferential treatment from the EU, by the WTO in 1999. Recent studies have also looked at the qualitative difference of capitalist globalization in comparison to earlier eras of capitalism, and shown how the region is becoming enmeshed in the accumulation chains of transnational business elites. This process has not only entailed significant advancements but also deeply rooted crises and inequality.

== Foreign investment ==
The European Investment Bank provided a $12 million loan to the Ministry of Finance in Barbados. This allowed the Barbados Water Authority (BWA) to rehabilitate the island's drinking water distribution network by improving efficiency, service quality, and resilience in order to mitigate the negative effects of climate change. This investment will help protect Barbados' water supply from climate change and more frequent extreme weather.

The European Investment Bank investment will pay for the replacement of around 16 kilometers of aging pipelines, as well as the restoration of water reservoirs and pumping facilities. This will help to preserve the island's scarce water resources.

The European Investment Bank is also collaborating with the national government to fund $60 million in emergency healthcare spending connected to the COVID-19 pandemic. This is also in collaboration with The Caribbean Development Bank (CDB) to provide $36 million to CDB's Borrowing Member Countries (BMCs) for the COVID-19 vaccines and other investments in healthcare, to limit the virus's spread.

The loan will assist Barbados' public health system, specifically for COVID-19 treatment, lab capacity and equipment, quarantine facilities, IT equipment, vaccine storage, contact tracing systems, and logistics, transport, and monitoring operations.

== Women and globalization ==
In 2010 the labor force participation rate in the Caribbean was 77% and in 2011 it was recorded that GDP per capital in the Caribbean communities average near $10,000. Due to the lack of economic opportunity and low GDP per capital levels, Caribbean people are traveling in large numbers to developed countries. Globally, Grenada has the third-highest percentage of emigrating at 67.3%, St. Kitts and Nevis is fourth at 61.0% and Guyana is fifth at 56.8%. Most of these Caribbean emigrants are women.

Historically, the Caribbean's banana industry has been one of the biggest exports; however, agriculture is beginning to decline in the world economy. Now, it is the exportation of labor that is on the rise in the Caribbean. Caribbean women are migrating to developed countries for the opportunity to study particularly in nursing programs. Women in the Caribbean migrate in large numbers to developed countries such as the United States, Canada, the United Kingdom, and France. These host countries have better education and resources that provide better health care knowledge and health care training. In these developed regions of the word, Caribbean women receive more on and off-the-job training as well. Educational opportunities for health care allow women in the Caribbean to receive advanced knowledge on nursing and their degrees are recognized in their host countries.

With advanced education come more career opportunities. In the host countries, there is a lot of demand for healthcare workers, which means more job opportunities for women. Caribbean women also emigrate in such large numbers to developed countries to earn higher pay. Income earned in host countries is usually enough for a female immigrant from the Caribbean to live off of and still send remittances back home. Additionally, the currencies from host countries have more purchasing power than the domestic currency in the Caribbean. Money being sent back to Caribbean countries allows for individuals to set up retirement accounts and provide financial support to the families that the Caribbean women left behind.

== Disadvantages ==
The labor exportation from the Caribbean to the host countries is offering education and employment opportunities to women, but is also limiting the opportunities for the Caribbean. The educated women who want to learn advanced skills and have the potential to make a difference in and on their home countries are travelling abroad, and in large part are staying abroad to take full advantage of the education and the economic prospects. The health care education systems and quality of health care declines because the participants are leaving. Guyana is one of the top 10 countries that export labor. In the rural areas, 80% of their health care is provided by nurses. Lately, however, there been serious deficiencies and neglect in the health care market due to Caribbean nurses staying abroad after pursuing their education. Guyana's economy is also heavily dependent of remittances. Guyana is one of the top countries to benefit from remittances from nursing labor. The country's largest source of foreign exchange is remittances with there being approximately $218 million United States dollars counted in 2006 from remittances, money that did not include transfers from the informal sectors. This dependence on the developed foreign economy leaves Guyana vulnerable to any changes or crashes that the developed country may face. The remittances that Guyana is receiving are helping to sustain the economy but also have the potential effect of really crippling it, if nurses lose their jobs or receive pay cuts and can no longer send back a hefty amount of remittances.

== Technology ==
The Caribbean governments are increasingly looking at the need for digital communications networks to help economic growth. In recent years the Caribbean-bloc of countries has signed to place the Central Banks of the Caribbean on the Pan-African Payment and Settlement System (PAPSS) to facilitate seamless transactions between the African Continental Free Trade Area and the Caribbean Community bloc.

== See also ==
- For more information, see these articles about Economy of the Caribbean.
- Blue economy
- Orange Economy
- United Nations Economic Commission for Latin America and the Caribbean
- Citizenship by investment
- Central banks and currencies of the Caribbean
- Arrowroot industry in Saint Vincent and the Grenadines
- Asphalt industry in Trinidad
- Banana industry in the Caribbean
- Citrus industry in the Caribbean
- Fishing industry in the Caribbean
- Tourism in the Caribbean
- Economic history of Latin America
- List of Latin American and Caribbean countries by GDP growth
- List of Latin American and Caribbean countries by GDP (nominal)
- List of Latin American and Caribbean countries by GDP (PPP)
- List of banks in the Americas
- List of stock exchanges in the Americas
