= Marta Sánchez Soler =

Mexican sociologist and activist

- Born: 1941 (age 84–85); Montauban, France
- Citizenship: Mexican
- Occupation: Sociologist
- Organization: Movimiento Migrante Mesoamericano

Martha Fernanda Sánchez Soler (born 1941) is a Mexican sociologist and activist. She is the president of the Movimiento Migrante Mesoamericano (MMM), a movement initiated in 2006, which aims to help mothers of migrants who have disappeared find their lost ones by travelling via caravan for several days along routes they usually make during their trip from their home country toward the United States. In 2016, she was one of the nine inspiring and influential Latin American women named in the BBC's 100 Women list.

== Early life ==
Sánchez Soler was born in Montauban, France in 1941 to refugees fleeing Francoist Spain. She was raised in Mexico and then completed her university studies in the United States, majoring in social science at San Diego State University of California. Her second husband, José Jacques y Medina, was a student activist who fled to the United States to avoid an arrest for protest during the Mexican Student Movement of 1968.

== Career ==
In the early part of her career, Sánchez worked as a teacher in a marginalized area of Southern California. Then she spent many years working with impoverished populations. Through the 1990s Sánchez worked in education and defending the human rights of marginalized people. She was responsible for implementing the Memorando de Entendimiento sobre Educación de Adultos (Memorandum of Understanding on Adult Education) in Baja California, which was signed by the Presidents of Mexico and the United States. She developed regional educational materials in Baja California to improve the quality of education delivered to migrant students. As a teacher, she helped improve the education of populations considered geographically dispersed and marginalized in Baja California.

In 2005, Sánchez helped establish the Caravan of Central American mothers, in which mothers search for their children who may have been arrested, kidnapped, or disappeared on their journey through Mexico to the U.S. Each year since the group's founding, mothers from several Central American countries gather and search along migration routes for family members who have gone missing. To raise awareness of the issue, Sánchez participates in conferences, like the 2nd Mesoamerican Meeting of Human Rights Defenders (Spanish: II Encuentro Mesoamericano de Defensoras de Derechos Humanos) held in El Salvador in 2013.

In 2006, Sánchez and her husband founded the Mesoamerican Migrant Movement to better facilitate the caravans and press for government action to protect migrants. Together with the movement, Sánchez Soler operates a caravan containing Central American mothers from Honduras, Nicaragua, El Salvador and Guatemala, who travel each year to find their children and raise awareness about the risks faced by migrants. Traveling the length of Mexico—but focusing on the southeastern border where most migrants enter the country—Sánchez has led groups for over a decade, resulting in locating more than 250 Central Americans among the missing.

Sánchez and three other activists, Pilar Arrese Alcala, Claudia Medina Tamariz and Brenda Rangel Ortiz attended the North American Leaders' Summit in mid-2016 to urge the leaders of Canada, Mexico and the United States to deal with the problems of detention, disappearance and torture, which has plagued various states in Mexico during the last decade as fallout from the war on drugs.
