= Caribbean Food Crops Society =

Logo of the Caribbean Food Crop Society

The Caribbean Food Crop Society is the regional trade association serving agronomists and agriculture for countries bordering on the Caribbean Sea. Agriculture is the largest sector of the economy of the Caribbean and it affects every nation and territory within the region. The Caribbean Food Crop Society is the organization through which people in the field have the opportunity to meet to discuss research and shared concerns and objectives.

The society was founded in 1963 by Richard Marshall Bond, the Director, and Arnold Krochmal Assistant Director of the United States Department of Agriculture's Experimental Station on St. Croix, United States Virgin Islands. The association had its first annual meeting at the Sandy Lane Hotel in Barbados in 1964.

== Venues by year ==
- 2004 – Saint John, U.S. Virgin Islands
- 2005 – Guadeloupe, French Antilles
- 2006 – Carolina, Puerto Rico, U.S.
- 2007 – San Jose, Costa Rica
- 2008 – Miami, Florida, U.S.
- 2009 - Basseterre, Saint Kitts
- 2010 - Dominican Republic
- 2011 - Bridgetown, Barbados
- 2012 - Costa Maya, Quintana Roo, Mexico
- 2013 - Port of Spain, Trinidad and Tobago
- 2014 - Saint Thomas, U.S.V.I.
- 2015 - Paramaribo, Suriname
- 2016 - Guadeloupe, French Antilles
- 2017 - San Juan, Puerto Rico
- 2018 - Belize City, Belize
- 2019 - Punta Cana, Dominican Republic
- 2020 - Ste-Luce, Martinique, F.A. cancelled
- 2021 None designated cancelled
- 2022 - Cayenne, French Guiana
- 2023 - St. George's, Grenada
- 2024 - Bávaro, Dominican Republic
- 2025 - Saint Martin/Sint Maarten
- 2026 - Saint Croix, United States Virgin Islands
- 2027 - Georgetown, Guyana
