= Partnership for Prosperity and Security in the Caribbean =

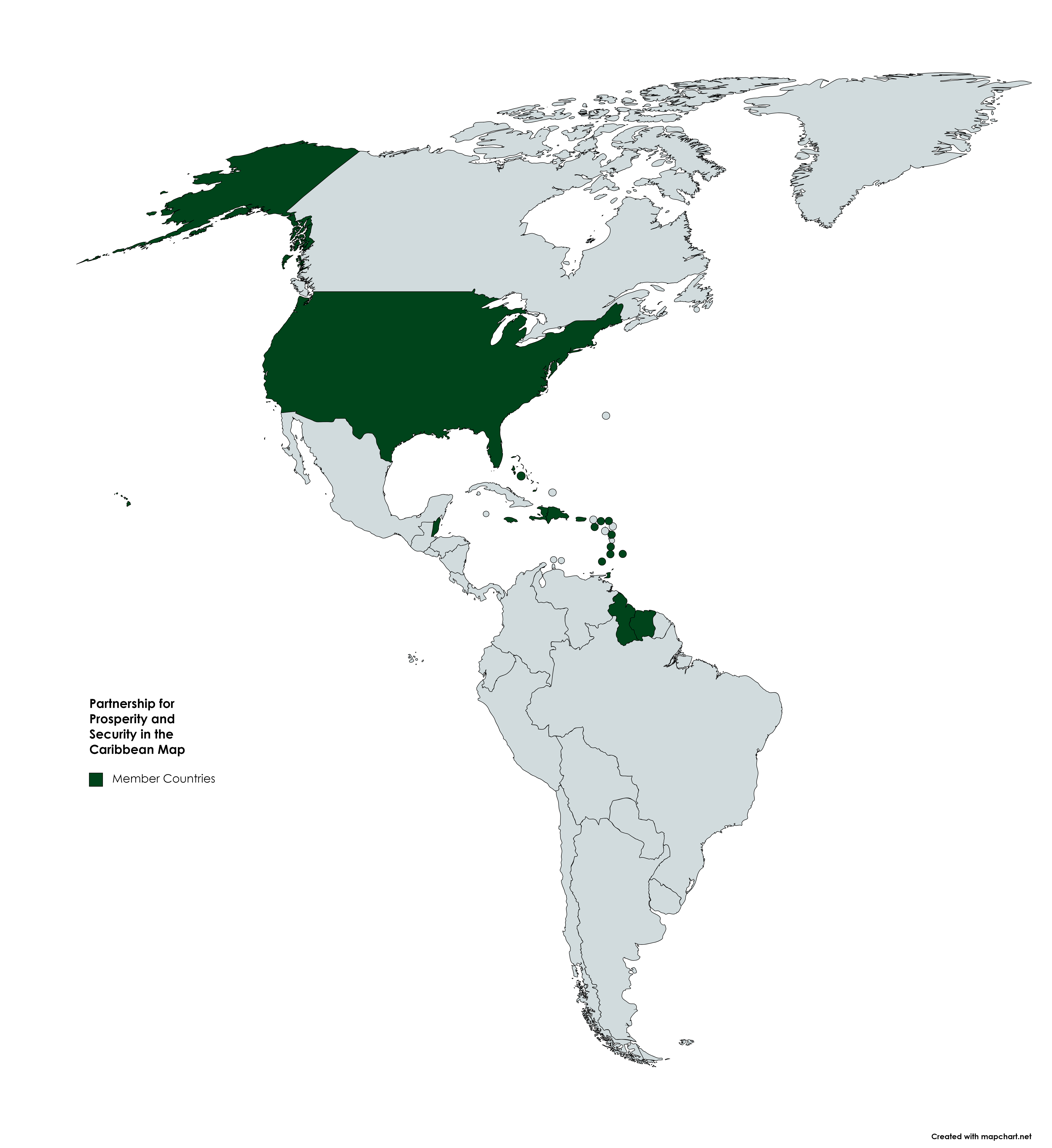
Partnership for Prosperity and Security in the Caribbean Map

The Partnership for Prosperity and Security in the Caribbean (PPS) is a regional-level dialogue with the stated purpose of providing greater cooperation on security and economic issues. The Partnership was founded in Bridgetown, Barbados on March 10, 1997 by the Governments of the United States of America, Antigua and Barbuda, the Commonwealth of The Bahamas, Barbados, Belize, the Commonwealth of Dominica, the Dominican Republic, Grenada, the Co-operative Republic of Guyana, the Republic of Haiti, Jamaica, the Federation of St. Kitts and Nevis, Saint Lucia, St. Vincent and the Grenadines, the Republic of Suriname and the Republic of Trinidad and Tobago.

The major areas covered under the agreement are trade, development, finance, the environment, justice, and security. As part of agreement, the heads agree to pledge their confidence and support in the establishment of the Free Trade Area of the Americas (FTAA) and adhering to the goals of World Trade Organization (WTO) as well as the multi-lateral agenda of security in the Caribbean region. The agreement also sets out a basis for helping the Caribbean countries combat the HIV/AIDS epidemic and for trans-regional illegal-drug interdiction cooperation with the United States.

== Political signees ==
Country	Government
Antigua and Barbuda	Lester Bird (Prime Minister)
The Bahamas, (The Commonwealth of)	Hubert Ingraham (Prime Minister)
Barbados	Owen Arthur (Prime Minister)
Belize	Dean Barrow (Prime Minister)
Dominica, (The Commonwealth of)	Edison James (Prime Minister)
Dominican Republic	Jaime David (Vice President)
Grenada	Keith Mitchell (Prime Minister)
Guyana, (Co-operative Republic of)	Samuel Hinds (Prime Minister)
Haiti, (Republic of)	René Préval (President)
Jamaica	Percival Patterson (Prime Minister)
Saint Kitts and Nevis, (Federation of)	Denzil Douglas (Prime Minister)
Saint Lucia	Vaughan Lewis (Prime Minister)
Saint Vincent and the Grenadines	James Mitchell (Prime Minister)
Suriname, (Republic of)	Jules Wijdenbosch (President)
Trinidad and Tobago, (Republic of)	Basdeo Panday (Prime Minister)
United States of America	William Clinton (President)

== See also ==
- Third Border Initiative
- Caribbean Basin Initiative (CBI)
- Caribbean Basin Trade Partnership Act (CBTPA)
- Free Trade Area of the Americas
- Caribbean Community (CARICOM)
- Caribbean Regional Maritime Agreement
- Security and Prosperity Partnership of North America (SPP)
