= Fishing industry =

Economic branch

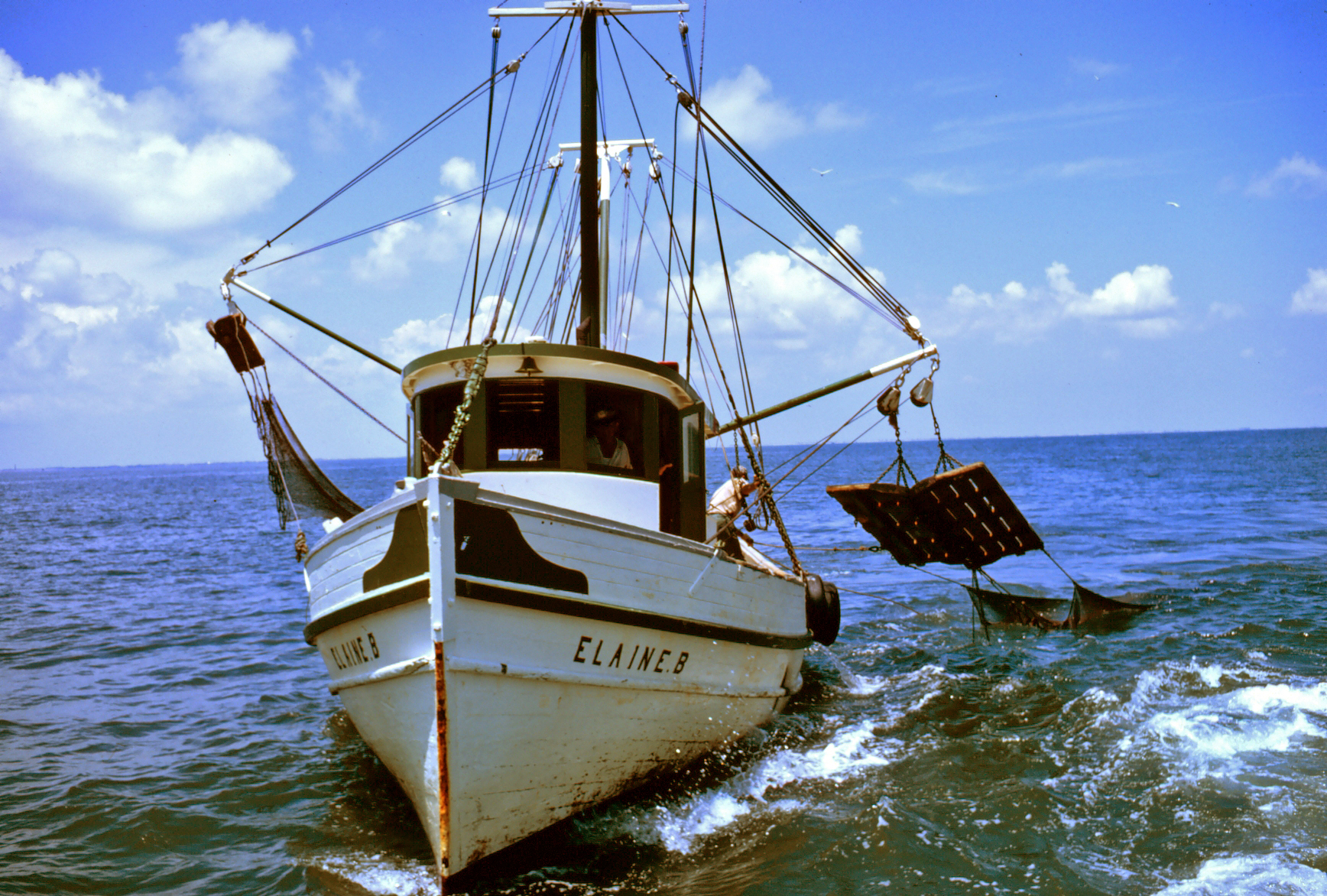
Double-rigged shrimp trawler hauling in the nets

The fishing industry includes any industry or activity that takes, cultures, processes, preserves, stores, transports, markets or sells fish or fish products. It is defined by the Food and Agriculture Organization as including recreational, subsistence and commercial fishing, as well as the related harvesting, processing, and marketing sectors. The commercial activity is aimed at the delivery of fish and other seafood products for human consumption or as input factors in other industrial processes. The livelihood of over 500 million people in developing countries depends directly or indirectly on fisheries and aquaculture.

The fishing industry is struggling with environmental and welfare issues, including overfishing and occupational safety. Additionally, the combined pressures of climate change, biodiversity loss and overfishing endanger the livelihoods and food security of a substantial portion of the global population. Stocks fished within biologically sustainable levels decreased from 90% in 1974 to 62.3% in 2021.

== Sectors ==
The industry has three principal sectors that include recreational, subsistence or traditional, and commercial fishing.

- The commercial sector comprises enterprises and individuals associated with wild-catch or aquaculture resources and the various transformations of those resources into products for sale. It is also referred to as the seafood industry, although non-food items such as pearls are included among its products.
- The traditional sector comprises enterprises and individuals associated with fisheries resources from which aboriginal people derive products in accordance with their traditions.
- The recreational sector comprises enterprises and individuals associated for the purpose of recreation, sport or sustenance with fisheries resources from which products are derived that are not for sale.
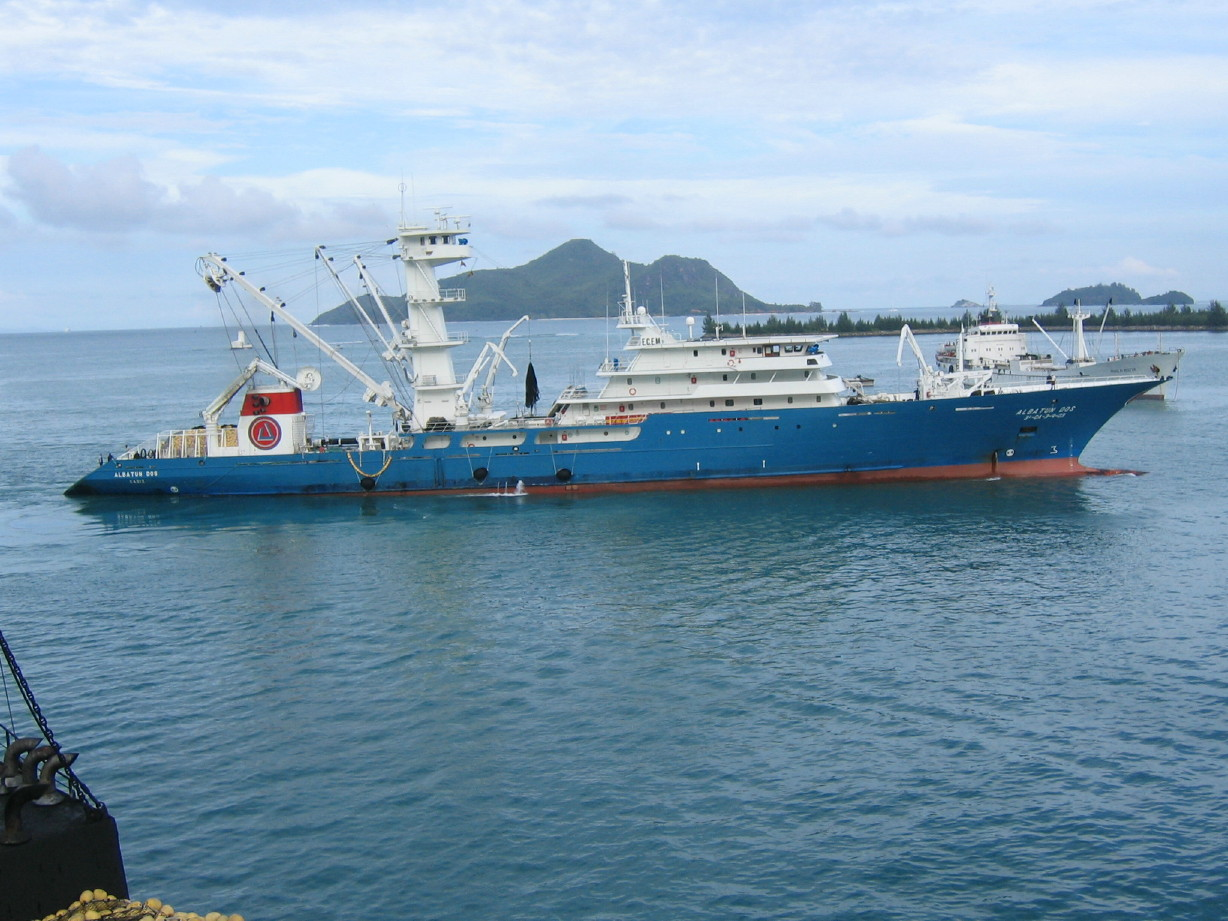
Modern Spanish tuna purse seiner in the Seychelles Islands

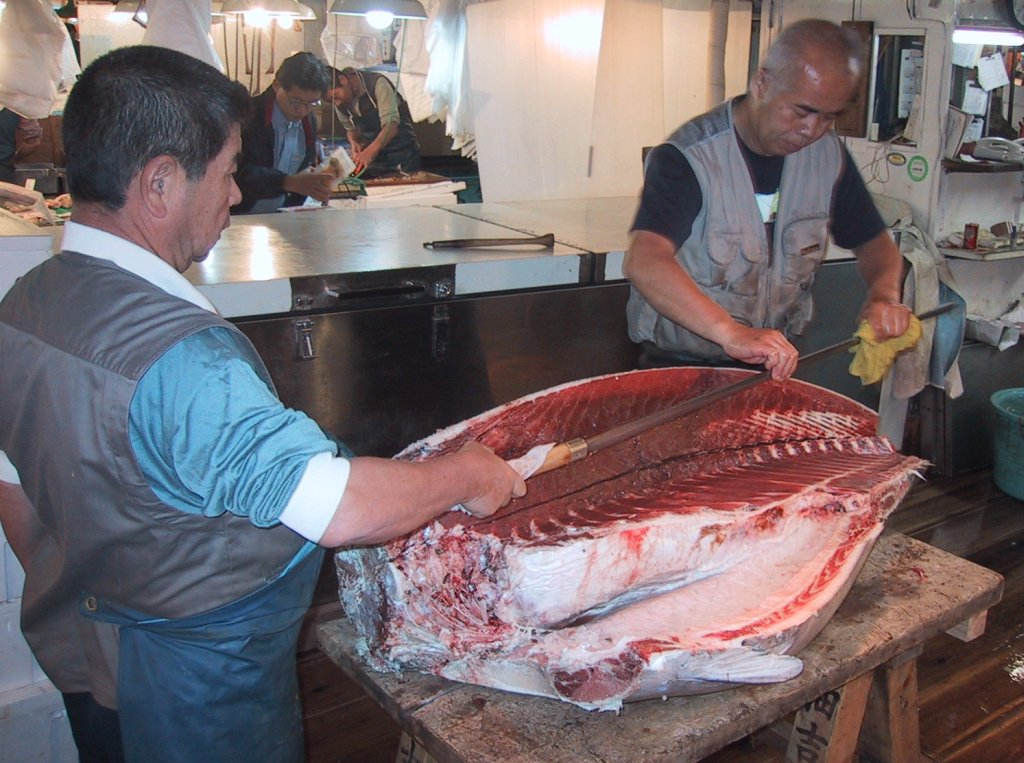
Using a special tuna knife at Tsukiji fish market in Tokyo

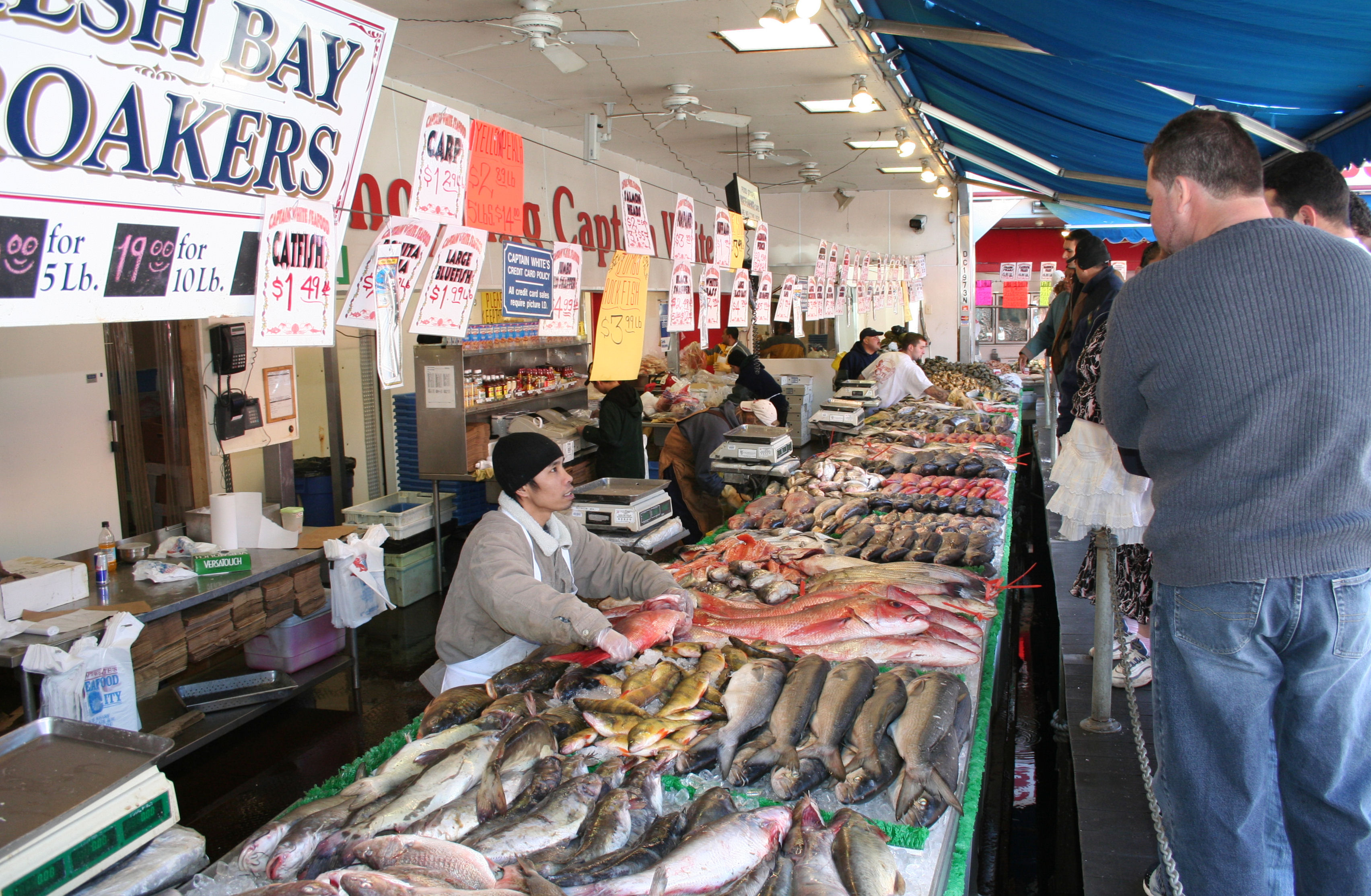
Fresh seafood laid out on one of several floating barge vendors at the Maine Avenue Fish Market in Washington D.C.

=== Commercial sector ===
- - wild
    - marine
      - pelagic
        - predator
          - tuna
          - billfish
          - shark
        - forage
          - herring
          - sardine
          - anchovy
          - menhaden
      - demersal
        - cod
        - flatfish
    - freshwater
  - farmed
    - carp
    - salmon
    - tilapia

Commercially important finfish fisheries

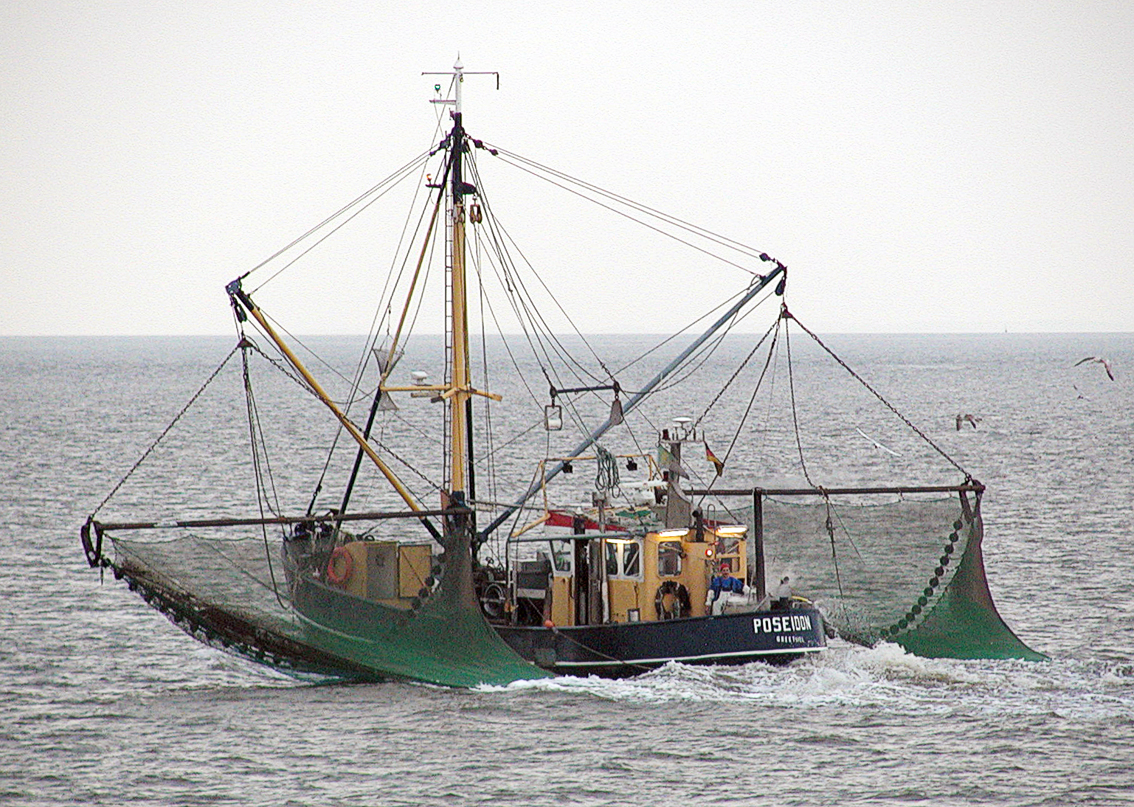
Commercial demersal fishing vessel in the North Sea

Commercial fishing is the activity of catching fish and other seafood for commercial profit, mostly from wild fisheries. It provides a large quantity of food to many countries around the world, but those who practice it as an industry must often pursue fish far into the ocean under adverse conditions. Large-scale commercial fishing is called industrial fishing.

The major fishing industries are not only owned by major corporations but by small families as well. In order to adapt to declining fish populations and increased demand, many commercial fishing operations have reduced the sustainability of their harvest by fishing further down the food chain. This process, often is referred to as "fishing down the food web," and raises serious concerns among scientists and fishery managers. Removing too many organisms from the lower levels of the food chain can disrupt entire ecosystems and threaten long-term sustainability.

Commercial fishermen harvest a wide variety of animals. However, a very small number of species support the majority of the world's fisheries; these include herring, cod, anchovy, tuna, flounder, mullet, squid, shrimp, salmon, crab, lobster, oyster and scallops. All except these last four provided a worldwide catch of well over a million tonnes in 1999, with herring and sardines together providing a catch of over 22 million metric tons in 1999. Many other species are fished in smaller numbers.

In 2016, of the 171 million tonnes of fish caught, about 88 percent or over 151 million tonnes were utilized for direct human consumption. This share has increased significantly in recent decades, as it was 67 percent in the 1960s. In 2016, the greatest part of the 12 percent used for non-food purposes (about 20 million tonnes) was reduced to fishmeal and fish oil (74 percent or 15 million tonnes), while the rest (5 million tonnes) was largely utilized as material for direct feeding in aquaculture and raising of livestock and fur animals, in culture (e.g. fry, fingerlings or small adults for ongrowing), as bait, in pharmaceutical uses and for ornamental purposes.

== World production ==
Contribution of fish to animal protein supply, average 2013–2015

Fish are harvested by commercial fishing and aquaculture. Stocks fished within biologically sustainable levels decreased from 90% in 1974 to 62.3% in 2021. The world harvest increased over the 20th century and, by 1986, had stabilized around 85–95 million metric tons (94×10^{6}–105×10^{6} short tons) per year. According to the Food and Agriculture Organization (FAO), the world harvest in 2005 consisted of 93.3 million metric tons (102.8×10^{6} short tons) captured by commercial fishing in wild fisheries, plus 48.1 million metric tons (53.0×10^{6} short tons) produced by fish farms. In addition, 1.3 million metric tons (1.4×10^{6} short tons) of aquatic plants (seaweed etc.) were captured in wild fisheries and 14.8 million metric tons (16.3×10^{6} short tons) were produced by aquaculture. The number of individual fish caught in the wild has been estimated at 0.97–2.7 trillion per year (not counting fish farms or marine invertebrates).

Following is a table of the 2011 world fishing industry harvest in tonnes (metric tons) by capture and by aquaculture.

	Capture (ton)	Aquaculture (ton)	Total (ton)
Total	94,574,113	83,729,313	178,303,426
Aquatic plant	1,085,143	20,975,361	22,060,504
Aquatic animal	93,488,970	62,753,952	156,202,922

World capture fisheries and aquaculture production

By species group

By production source

== Related industries ==
Once fish is caught, especially in commercial sectors, bringing the fish to consumers require a complex series of related industries.

=== Fish processing ===
Fish processing is the processing of fish delivered by commercial fisheries and fish farms. The larger fish processing companies have their own fishing fleets and independent fisheries. The products of the industry are usually sold wholesale to grocery chains or to intermediaries. Fish processing can be subdivided into two categories: fish handling (the initial processing of raw fish) and fish products manufacturing. Aspects of fish processing occur on fishing vessels, fish processing vessels, and at fish processing plants.

Another natural subdivision is into primary processing involved in the filleting and freezing of fresh fish for onward distribution to fresh fish retail and catering outlets, and the secondary processing that produces chilled, frozen and canned products for the retail and catering trades.

=== Fish products ===
Fisheries are estimated to currently provide 16% of the world population's protein. The flesh of many fish are primarily valued as a source of food; there are many edible species of fish. Other marine life taken as food includes shellfish, crustaceans, sea cucumber, jellyfish and roe.

Fish and other marine life can also be used for many other uses: pearls and mother-of-pearl, sharkskin and rayskin. Sea horses, star fish, sea urchins and sea cucumber are used in traditional Chinese medicine. Tyrian purple is a pigment made from marine snails, and sepia is a pigment made from the inky secretions of cuttlefish. Fish glue has long been valued for its use in all manner of products. Isinglass is used for the clarification of wine and beer. Fish emulsion is a fertilizer emulsion that is produced from the fluid remains of fish processed for fish oil and fish meal.

Fish derived protein hydrolysates have been identified to exhibit a wide range of bioactivities making them important to food and health care industries. Hydrolysates derived from fish processing by-products like swim bladder, skin, scale, bones and fins display blood pressure regulatory, anti-inflammatory, neuroprotective, immunomodulatory and anti-cancer activity. Fish hydrolysates are also on the rise for commercial purposes in food industries due to their lipid peroxidation inhibition, high emulsification activity and large water retention capacity making them effective food matrix stabilization and shelf life enhancement agents. In the industry, the term seafood products is often used instead of fish products.

=== Fish marketing ===
Fish markets are marketplace used for the trade in and sale of fish and other seafood. They can be dedicated to wholesale trade between fishermen and fish merchants, or to the sale of seafood to individual consumers, or to both. Retail fish markets, a type of wet market, often sell street food as well.

Most shrimp are sold frozen and are marketed in different categories. The live food fish trade is a global system that links fishing communities with markets.

== Environmental impact ==
Greenhouse gas emissions (kg / kg edible weight) of wild-caught and farmed seafood products

The environmental impact of fishing includes issues such as the availability of fish, overfishing, fisheries, and fisheries management; as well as the impact of industrial fishing on other elements of the environment, such as bycatch. These issues are part of marine conservation, and are addressed in fisheries science programs. According to a 2019 FAO report, global production of fish, crustaceans, molluscs and other aquatic animals has continued to grow and reached 172.6 million tonnes in 2017, with an increase of 4.1 percent compared with 2016. There is a growing gap between the supply of fish and demand, due in part to world population growth.

Fishing and pollution from fishing are the largest contributors to the decline in ocean health and water quality. Ghost nets, or nets abandoned in the ocean, are made of plastic and nylon and do not decompose, wreaking extreme havoc on the wildlife and ecosystems they interrupt. Overfishing and destruction of marine ecosystems may have a significant impact on other aspects of the environment such as seabird populations. On top of the overfishing, there is a seafood shortage resulting from the mass amounts of seafood waste, as well as the microplastics that are polluting the seafood consumed by the public. The latter is largely caused by plastic-made fishing gear like drift nets and longlining equipment that are worn down by use, lost or thrown away.

The journal Science published a four-year study in November 2006, which predicted that, at prevailing trends, the world would run out of wild-caught seafood in 2048. The scientists stated that the decline was a result of overfishing, pollution and other environmental factors that were reducing the population of fisheries at the same time as their ecosystems were being annihilated. Many countries, such as Tonga, the United States, Australia and Bahamas, and international management bodies have taken steps to appropriately manage marine resources.

Mean greenhouse gas emissions of different fisheries
Food types	Greenhouse gas emissions (g CO_{2}-C_{eq} per g protein)
Recirculating aquaculture	30
Trawling fishery	26
Non-recirculating aquaculture	12
Non-trawling fishery	8.6

Reefs are also being destroyed by overfishing because of the huge nets that are dragged along the ocean floor while trawling. Many corals are being destroyed and, as a consequence, the ecological niche of many species is at stake. Food and Agriculture Organization (FAO) estimates 30−70% of the waste and by-products generated by fisheries and aquaculture can be transformed for food or non-food usages (e.g. silage, biofuel, fertilizer) or converted into high‐value products (e.g. collagen, gelatin, bioactive peptides, chitin, chitosan). In 2024 the percentage of assessed stocks classified as biologically sustainable by the Food and Agriculture Organization (FAO) declined to 62.4% in 2023, from 64.5% in 2021, with wide differences across regions and species groups.

== Sustainable fishery ==
A conventional idea of a sustainable fishery is that it is one that is harvested at a sustainable rate, where the fish population does not decline over time because of fishing practices. Sustainability in fisheries combines theoretical disciplines, such as the population dynamics of fisheries, with practical strategies, such as avoiding overfishing through techniques such as individual fishing quotas, curtailing destructive and illegal fishing practices by lobbying for appropriate law and policy, setting up protected areas, restoring collapsed fisheries, incorporating all externalities involved in harvesting marine ecosystems into fishery economics, educating stakeholders and the wider public, and developing independent certification programs.

Some primary concerns around sustainability are that heavy fishing pressures, such as overexploitation and growth or recruitment overfishing, will result in the loss of significant potential yield; that stock structure will erode to the point where it loses diversity and resilience to environmental fluctuations; that ecosystems and their economic infrastructures will cycle between collapse and recovery; with each cycle less productive than its predecessor; and that changes will occur in the trophic balance (fishing down marine food webs).

== International disputes ==
The ocean covers 71% of the earth's surface and 80% of the value of exploited marine resources are attributed to the fishing industry. The fishing industry has provoked various international disputes as wild fish capture rose to a peak about the end of the 20th century, and has since started a gradual decline. Iceland, Japan, and Portugal are the greatest consumers of seafood per capita in the world.

=== Americas ===
Chile and Peru are countries with high fish consumption, and therefore had troubles regarding their fish industries. In 1947, Chile and Peru first adopted the 200 nautical mile standard as their exclusive economic zone (EEZ), and in 1982, the UN formally adopted this term. In the 2000s, Chile and Peru suffered a serious fish crisis because of excessive fishing and lack of proper regulations. From the late 1950s, offshore bottom trawlers began exploiting the deeper part, leading to a large catch increase and a strong decline in the underlying biomass. The stock collapsed to extremely low levels in the early 1990s and this is a well-known example of non-excludable, non-rivalrous public good in economics, causing free-rider problems.

Following the collapse of the Atlantic northwest cod fishery in 1992, a dispute arose between Canada and the European Union over the right to fish Greenland halibut (also known as turbot) just outside of Canada's exclusive economic zone in the Grand Banks of Newfoundland. The dispute became known as the Turbot War. On 9 March 1995, in response to observations of foreign vessels fishing illegally in Canadian waters and using illegal equipment outside of Canada's EEZ, Canadian officials boarded and seized the Spanish trawler Estai in international waters on the Grand Banks. Throughout March, the Spanish Navy deployed patrol ships to protect fishing boats in the area, and Canadian forces were authorized to open fire on any Spanish vessel showing its guns. Canada and the European Union reached a settlement on 15 April which led to significant reforms in international fishing agreements.

=== Europe ===
Iceland is one of the largest consumers in the world and in 1972, a dispute occurred between UK and Iceland because of Iceland's announcement of an Exclusive Economic Zone (EEZ) to reduce overfishing. This dispute is called the Cod Wars, direct confrontations between Icelandic patrol vessels and British warships.

Nowadays in Europe in general, countries are searching for a way to recover their fishing industries. Overfishing of EU fisheries is costing 3.2 billion euros a year and 100,000 jobs according to a report. So Europe is looking for some actions that could be taken to prevent overfishing.

=== Asia ===
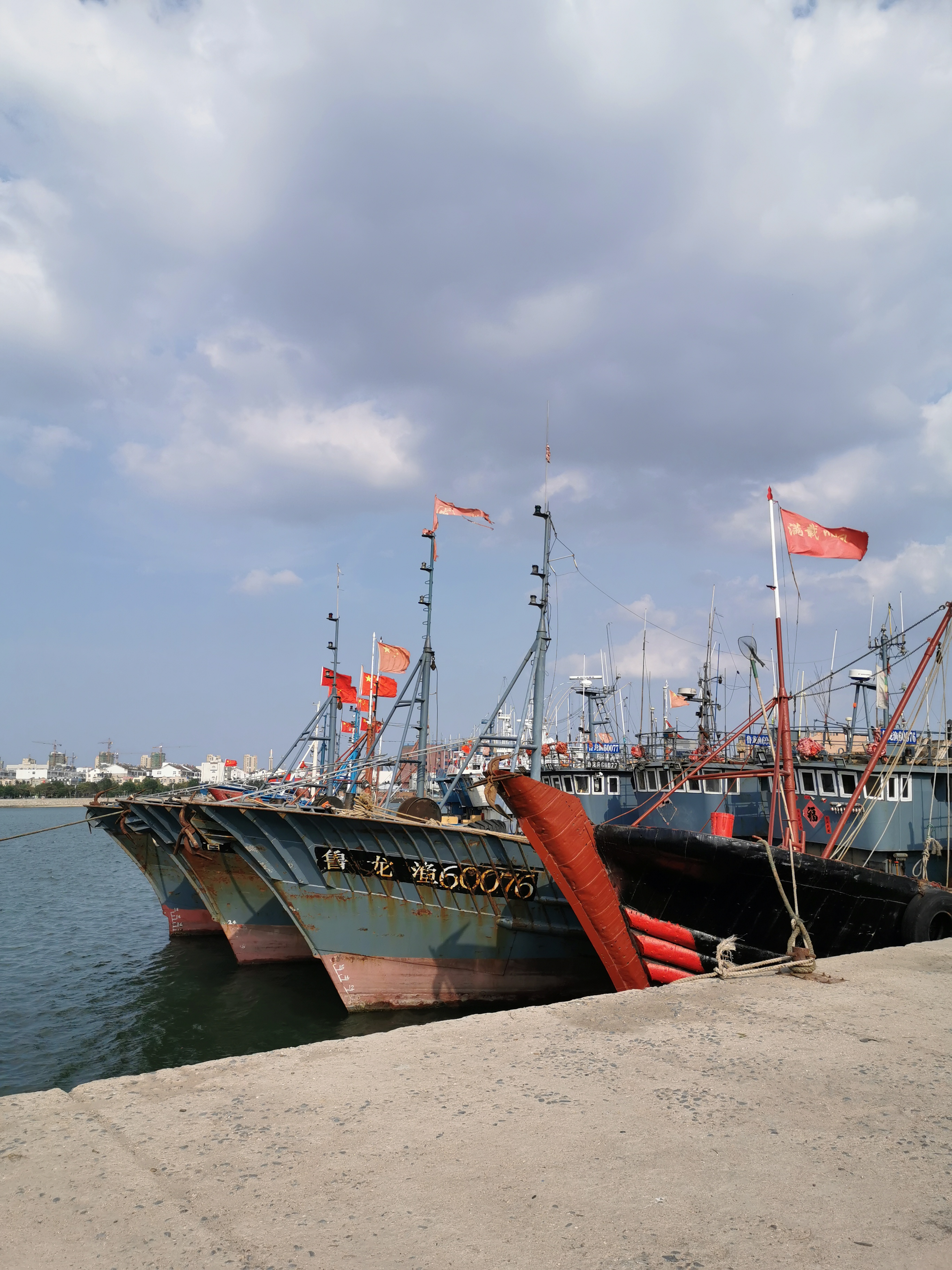
Fishing Harbor in Longkou, China

Japan, China and Korea are some of the greatest consumers of fish, and have some disputes over Exclusive Economic Zone. In 2011, due to a serious earthquake, the nuclear power facility in Fukushima was damaged. A huge amount of contaminated water leaked and entered the ocean. Tokyo Electric Power Company (Tepco) admitted that around 300 tonnes of highly radioactive water had leaked from a storage tank on the site. In the Kuroshio Current, the sea near Fukushima, about 11 countries catch fish. Not only the surrounding countries such as Japan, Korea and China, but also the countries like Ukraine, Spain and Russia have boats in the Kuroshio Current. In September 2013, South Korea banned all fish imports from eight Japanese prefectures, due to the radioactive water leaks from the Fukushima nuclear plant.

The North Pacific Anadromous Fish Commission: NPFC was established in 2015 to manage fish stocks against increasing demand. Members are Canada, Japan, Russia, the United States, and South Korea. China, Taiwan, and Vanuatu also participated in the meeting. The NPFC imposes catch limits on member countries and countries participating in the conference. A crackdown on Illegal, unreported and unregulated fishing (IUU) vendors was also requested.

== Society and culture ==
=== Global goals ===
International policy to attempt to address these issues is captured in Sustainable Development Goal 14 ("Life below water") and its Target 14.4 on "Sustainable fishing": "By 2020, effectively regulate harvesting and end overfishing, illegal, unreported and unregulated fishing and destructive fishing practices and implement science-based management plans, in order to restore fish stocks in the shortest time feasible, at least to levels that can produce maximum sustainable yield as determined by their biological characteristics".

=== Standards and labelling ===
The Marine Stewardship Council (MSC) is an independent non-profit organization which sets a standard for sustainable fishing. Fisheries that wish to demonstrate they are well-managed and sustainable compared to the MSC's standards are assessed by a team of experts or Conformity Assessment Bodies (CABs) who are independent of both the fishery and the MSC.

== See also ==
- Fishery
- Fishing industry by country
- Fishing industry in the Caribbean
- List of countries by fish and seafood consumption
- Sustainable fishing
