= Maritime drug trafficking in Latin America =

Maritime drug trafficking in Latin America is the primary means of transportation of illegal drugs produced in this region to global consumer markets. Cocaine is the primary illegal drug smuggled through maritime routes because all of its cultivation and production is settled in the Andean region of South America.

The smuggling of drugs through the sea is a security problem for all the countries of the region. Drug trafficking organizations have developed various complex systems for the transportation and distribution of illegal drugs, where several countries in the region serve as points of contact for the distribution of illegal products by land, air or sea.

It is estimated that 90% of the cocaine produced in the Andean region is transported at some point by sea.

== Historical overview ==
The first data on maritime drug trafficking from Latin America to the main drug consumption market in the Americas: United States of America is from the 1960s when the Coast Guard of that country registered an exponential increase in seizures of marijuana. It was introduced by sea on the Caribbean routes where fishing boats and speedboats made their entry into the continental United States.

In 1976, the first seizure of cocaine on the coasts of the United States was registered and the increase of ships with drugs in the Pacific Ocean was recorded. While in 1980 the first transatlantic routes for the smuggling of cocaine to Europe have as ports of entry the ports of Catalonia and Galicia in Spain.

Beginning in 1990 with the end of the Colombian Cartel boom and the replacement of Mexican cartels, there is an increase in shipments to the Central American coasts and the Mexican coastlines where most of the drug shipments from the South America, mostly cocaine, are able to arrive by land to the United States. This has triggered a series of violent actions among drug trafficking organizations for the control of the flux of drugs in Mexican ports.

== Main routes ==
The routes for the traffic of drugs to the United States and Western Europe, the main markets for drugs produced in Latin America are three: the Pacific route, the Caribbean route, and the Atlantic route. Drug trafficking organizations continue making stops in different countries of Central America or to replenish or to transport it by land the product to the US-Mexico border in its direct routes to the United States. In their routes to Europe they sail to the Caribbean where they transship the narcotics to commercial boats or vessels with greater reach which have direct routes to the main ports of entry in Europe like ones in Netherlands and Belgium in the North and Spain and Portugal in the South. Also, there have been reports of drugs seizures in the ports of United Kingdom and Ireland.

=== The Caribbean route ===
The Caribbean route, in spite of being used previously as a point of incursion to introduce drugs to the United States due to its proximity to the State of Florida, currently serves as a traffic point where approximately 40% of the cocaine destined for the European market stops to be transshipped to other boats that leave for the West African or directly to the European ports having as main entrances the ports of England, Netherlands, Portugal and Spain.

=== The Pacific route ===
In this route, the main ports of exit for drug trafficking are Colombia, Peru, and Ecuador, the route has been helped by traffickers as it is a direct route to the United States, or to Mexican ports where they are finally transported to the US-Mexico border. The essence of this route is that trafficking organizations can also use it to disembark in the Central American countries to transfer it to land routes or other vessels with higher transport capacity. The case of Panama is the most relevant due to its strategic importance in international trade where the organizations' criminals slink in commercial vessels with higher capacity their products to provide a camouflage mixing the legal traffic of goods. Another characteristic of this route is that also from the designated points have direct routes to the Pacific region of Asia and Oceania where there has been substantial growth in the use of drugs produced in Latin America.

=== The Atlantic route ===
Maritime drug trafficking from Latin America to United States as of 1985 according to the Central Intelligence Agency (CIA)

This route, primarily used by drug traffickers, is based on the departure of cargoes from the countries of the southern cone of the American continent with routes that are primarily destined for Africa, which is generally fed by vessels leaving Brazil due to its proximity to this continent. As well as there have been registered vessels departing of ports in Argentina and Uruguay where the destination is Europe.

== Vessels and transportation methods ==
The networks that organized crime organizations have created are complex because they are continually evolving along with the actions implemented by the authorities to detect drug shipments. However, these criminal organizations tend to improve their processes and creatively find more subtle and ingenious ways to hide drug shipments within the different vessels they use to move hundreds of tons per year through the seas of Latin America.

=== Types of vessels used to smuggle drugs ===
Examples of Vessels used by Drug Trafficking Organizations
Vessels
Submarines
Go-Fast
Fishing Vessels
Pangas

Along with this that already implies a risk for the international maritime security due to the fact that the cargo traffic in the seas is not it is duly supervised, it should be added the lack security that can be considered lax in the ports of destination where there are other distribution chains that can be corrupted by these organizations. Despite the constant attempts of the security forces to reduce the demand for drugs while trying to cut off the supply of drugs to consumer countries, drug trafficking organizations have resorted to creative smuggling techniques and introducing drug shipments along with the legal goods where they are finally recovered for distribution in the destination countries.

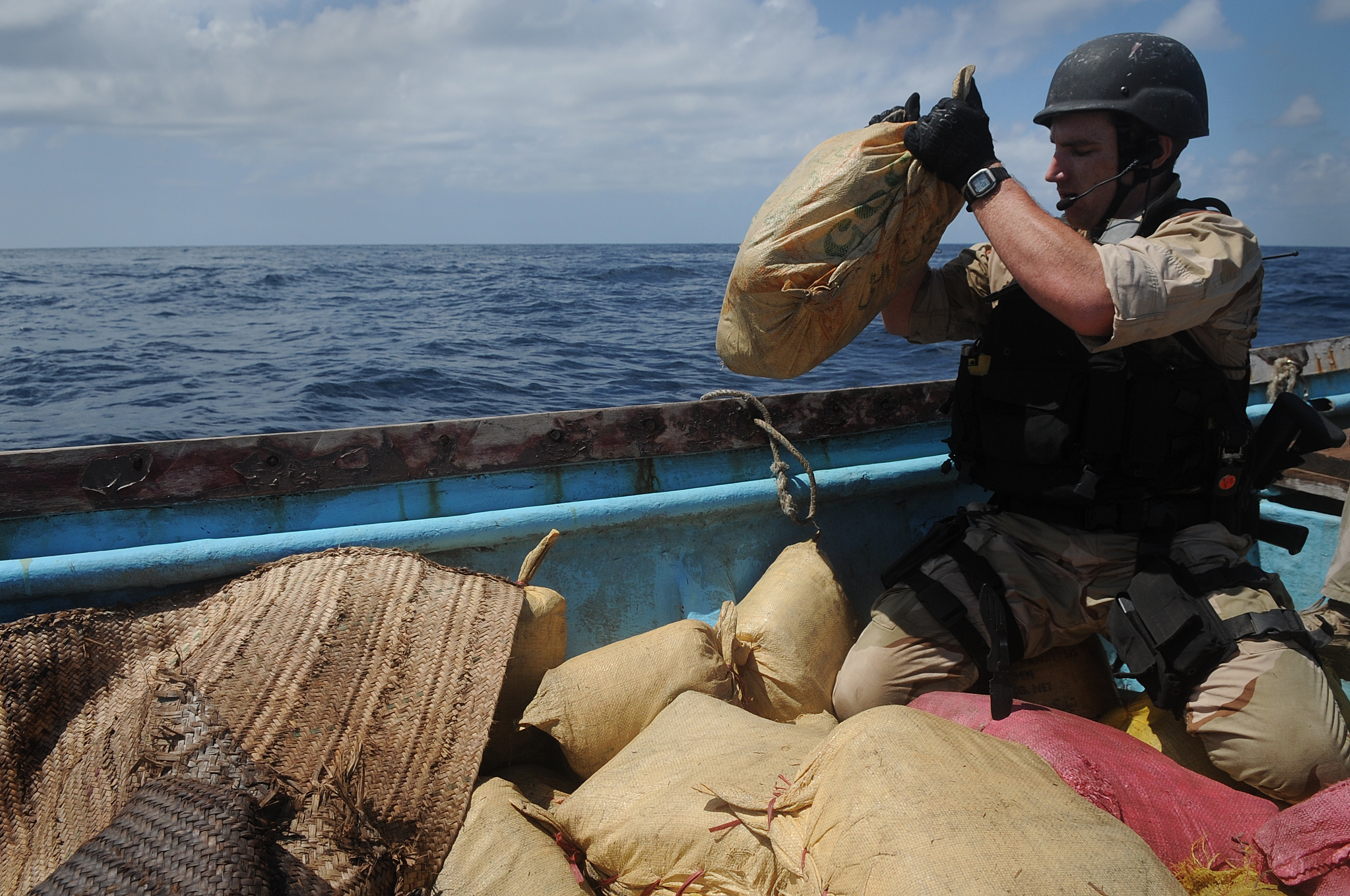
US drug seizure off the coast of Somalia

Among other methods to smuggle drug shipments are:

- Transshipment
- Container smuggling
- Torpedoes

== Responses ==
Maritime drug trafficking has had a great impact within Latin American countries, drug smuggling has not been properly sized. Therefore, the countries involved have resorted to different mechanisms of international cooperation to reduce traffic in the marine regions of Latin America where intelligence operations and shared information systems have been the main tools for the mitigation of this activity.

So the responses by the forces have varied extensively throughout the fight against drugs which highlights the coordinated operations between the countries involved such operations like Operation Martillo, Operation Lionfish III, and Operation Panama Express.

The legal gears with which countries currently operate to conduct naval operations in order to combat the traffic of drugs are found in the United Nations Convention on the Law of the Sea (UNCLOS) in the articles 27 and 108 while the United Nations Convention Against Illicit Traffic in Narcotic Drugs and Psychotropic Substances in Article 17 establishes the limitations in the prosecution of vessels that are related to drug trafficking.

Article 27 subsection (d) of United Nations Convention on the Law of the Sea:

The criminal jurisdiction of the coastal State should not be exercised on board a foreign ship passing through the territorial sea to arrest any person or to conduct any investigation in connection with any crime committed on board the ship during its passage, save only in the following cases: (d) if such measures are necessary for the suppression of illicit traffic in narcotic drugs or psychotropic substances.

Article 108 of the same convention states:

1. All States shall cooperate in the suppression of illicit traffic in narcotic drugs and psychotropic substances engaged in by ships on the high seas contrary to international conventions

Article 17 subsections 3 and 4 of the United Nations Convention Against Illicit Traffic in Narcotic Drugs and Psychotropic Substances establishes that:

3. A Party which has reasonable grounds to suspect that a vessel exercising freedom of navigation in accordance with international law, and flying the flag or displaying marks of registry of another Party is engaged in illicit traffic may so notify the flag State, request confirmation of registry and, if confirmed, request authorization from the flag State to take appropriate measures in regard to that vessel.

4. In accordance with paragraph 3 or in accordance with treaties in force between them or in accordance with any agreement or arrangement otherwise reached between those Parties, the flag State may authorize the requesting State to, inter aria: a) Board the vessel; b) Search the vessel; c) If evidence of involvement in illicit traffic is found, take appropriate action with respect to the vessel, persons and cargo on board.

2. Any State which has reasonable grounds for believing that a ship flying its flag is engaged in illicit traffic in narcotic drugs or psychotropic substances may request the cooperation of other States to suppress such traffic.

The legal gears at the international level make it difficult to intercept ships involved in drug trafficking without prior authorization from the State where the vessel is registered. This is an obstacle on combating narcotics trafficking at sea for which different countries have implemented a series of legal measures and bilateral agreements to intervene in a fortuitous manner and in a spirit of cooperation with other nations to reduce traffic in the seas. United States stands out in the implementation of agreements with other nations by having agreements with the Caribbean and South American countries to intervene in vessels of these nations suspected of trafficking drugs.

== See also ==
- 2025 United States military strikes on alleged drug traffickers
- 2025 United States naval deployment in the Caribbean
- Caribbean Regional Maritime Agreement
- United Nations Office on Drugs and Crime
- United Nations Commission on Narcotic Drugs
