= Third Border Initiative =

American policy

The Third Border Initiative (TBI) is an area of policy concerning United States and the Caribbean region. The phrase was especially made popular by the administration of US president George W. Bush. The Third Border Initiative was a reference to the Caribbean region's adjacent placement to the United States. The policy is the ideology that behind Canada and Mexico the Caribbean region is a sea-based border of the United States.

== Overview ==
The initiative also builds upon the founding of the Caribbean/United States - Partnership for Prosperity and Security in the Caribbean (1997). An agreement which is sometimes called the "Bridgetown Accord". This agreement is also complemented with other agreements for Maritime co-operation between the United States and countries of the Caribbean region. These other agreements include: the Maritime Counter-Narcotics Co-operation Agreement (1996), the Maritime Counter-Narcotics ("Shiprider") Agreement (1997), and the Western Hemisphere Travel Initiative. Many of these agreements were signed between the Clinton Administration of the United States, and the various independent countries of the Caribbean region in May 1997.

== See also ==
- Canada–United States border
- Caribbean Basin Initiative (CBI)
- Caribbean Basin Trade Partnership Act (CBTPA)
- Caribbean Regional Maritime Agreement
- Free Trade Area of the Americas
- Caribbean Community (CARICOM)

== Notes ==
- Williams, Michelle (Spring 2000) [2000]. Caribbean Shiprider Agreements: Sunk by Banana Trade War?. Vol. 31. Joe Christensen, Inc. (Via The University of Miami Inter-American Law Review). pp. 163–195.
- Buddan, Robert (14 January 2007). "Crime, deportees, and the Third Border". Jamaica Observer. Archived from the original on 2007-01-23.
- Singh, Rickey (7 March 2010). "Cases of 'bullying' US politics". Jamaica Observer. Archived from the original on 2010-03-09.
