= Human trafficking in Jamaica =

Jamaica is a source, transit, and destination country for adults and children trafficked for the purposes of sexual exploitation and forced labor.

Domestically, most victims are impoverished women and children enticed from rural parts of the country to metropolitan areas by family members or newspaper classified job postings for spa attendants, masseurs, or exotic dancers. After they are recruited, victims are coerced into prostitution. Sex tourism in resort areas has been identified as a problem.

Jamaica is reported to be a destination country for women trafficked from the Dominican Republic, Russia, Eastern Europe, Cuba, to work in the sex trade. Some Jamaican women and girls have been trafficked to Canada, the United States, the Bahamas, and other Caribbean destinations for commercial sexual exploitation.

While the Government of Jamaica and numerous NGOs have endeavored to combat the problem, the response is widely viewed as lacking and inadequate.

U.S. State Department's Office to Monitor and Combat Trafficking in Persons placed the country in "Tier 2" in 2017.

== Modes of victimization ==
The majority of victims are poor Jamaican women and girls, and increasingly boys, who were trafficked from rural to urban and tourist areas for commercial sexual exploitation. Victims are typically recruited by family members or newspaper advertisements promoting work as spa attendants, masseuses, or dancers. After being recruited, victims are coerced into prostitution. Jamaican children also might be subjected to conditions of forced labor as domestic servants. Sex tourism in resort areas has been identified as a problem.

Some trafficking of women from the Dominican Republic, Russia, Eastern Europe, Cuba, and Haiti into Jamaica's sex trade has been reported. Some Jamaican women and girls have been trafficked to Canada, the United States, the Bahamas, and other Caribbean destinations for commercial sexual exploitation.

== Efforts to combat human trafficking in Jamaica ==
The Government of Jamaica has undertaken efforts to combat human trafficking in the country. In 2016, the country was upgraded from a "Tier 2 Watch List" ranking to "Tier 2." Despite these efforts and accomplishments, the United States Department of State, in its 2016 Trafficking in Persons (TIP) Report, characterized these efforts as not fully meeting the minimum standards for the elimination of trafficking outlined in the Trafficking Victims Protection Act. Nevertheless, members of the Jamaican Government have complained that differences in the criteria used to determine what crimes constitute trafficking in persons as opposed to, for instance, sexual exploitation, cause the TIP Report to paint an inaccurate portrait of the state of human trafficking in the country and the government's efforts to combat it.

=== Prosecution ===
Between 2007 and 2012, about 16 convictions for crimes constituting Trafficking in Persons were secured.

The Government of Jamaica maintained anti-trafficking law enforcement efforts during the US State Department's reporting period, but did not punish any trafficking offenders. Legislatively, the government prohibits all forms of trafficking through its comprehensive Trafficking in Persons Act, which became effective on 1 March 2007, and which prescribes penalties of up to 10 years' imprisonment, penalties that are sufficiently stringent. This law also prohibits holding a person's passport as a means of keeping an individual in labor or service. During the reporting period, the government charged four suspects with trafficking under its new law; these cases remain pending, in addition to six prosecutions from the previous year. The government did not convict or sentence any traffickers during the reporting period. The government also dedicated six police officers to the National Task Force against Trafficking in Persons, an inter-agency body that coordinates anti-trafficking activities, and reconstituted the organized-crime division of its police force to focus more attention on human trafficking crimes. A vetted police Airport Interdiction Task Force, created through a memorandum of understanding between Jamaica and the United States in 2005, investigates cases of drug trafficking and human trafficking at ports of entry. In conjunction with the International Organization for Migration (IOM), several police, consular, and judicial officials received anti-trafficking training. No reports of official complicity with human trafficking were received in 2007.

In 2016, after a case of suspected jury interference, the director of public prosecutions recommended that individuals charged with human trafficking be tried by judge only.

=== Prevention ===
The Trafficking in Persons, Prevention, Suppression and Punishment Act became law in Jamaica in 2007, with the goal of identifying, sanctioning, and preventing human trafficking, and to assist and protecting vulnerable potential victims as well as those rescued from captivity.

In 2014, C-TOC undertook an operation named 'Operation ID-Fix' with the goal of identifying links between sex shops and massage parlours and human trafficking, leading to the arrest of 41 individuals, including a proprietor, sex workers, and patrons. The campaign encompassed 31 tactical operations and identified and rescued 12 victims.

In 2015, the Jamaica Constabulary Force implemented its Counter-Terrorism and Organized Crime (C-TOC) Investigation Branch with a unit dedicated to combating trafficking in persons.

=== Protection ===
During the State Department's reporting period, it was found that the government showed limited efforts to provide victims with access to medical, psychological, legal, or witness protection services. Specialized shelters for trafficking victims, especially for victims of commercial sexual exploitation, remained unavailable, although child trafficking victims had access to generalized government shelters for care. Shelter services for adult victims were said to be lacking, although adult victims were sometimes housed in hotels or other temporary facilities. Pursuant to its anti-trafficking statute, Jamaican authorities encouraged victims to assist in the investigation and prosecution of their traffickers. Victims were not penalized for immigration violations or other unlawful acts committed as a direct result of being trafficked. Jamaica provided temporary residency for foreign trafficking victims and other legal alternatives to deportation to countries where victims would face hardship or retribution. In 2007, the government assisted IOM's repatriation of a trafficking victim from Burma who had been exploited for five years as a domestic servant.

Prevention in this Activity The government increased anti-trafficking prevention activities during the period covered by the US State Department report. Government officials condemned human trafficking in public statements and presentations, in addition to warning more than 250 students about the dangers of human trafficking. Anti-trafficking flyers and materials were disseminated widely. The government also tightened issuance of exotic dancer permits to Jamaican hotel establishments, and eliminated their use in night clubs. Efforts to identify victims of trafficking among holders of these permits were intensified during the reporting period, and the government reduced the total number of permits to eight. The report suggested that increased government collaboration with Jamaica's hotel and tourism industry would assist efforts to prevent child sex tourism in resort areas; despite reported sexual exploitation of Jamaican children by foreign tourists, no investigations or prosecutions of such suspected criminal activity were reported by the government. The report recognized the government's efforts to address the demand for commercial sex acts by conducting high-profile raids on hotels and nightclubs.
