= List of Caribbean companies =

This is a list of companies from the countries in the Caribbean Community.

- Caribbean Community companies.
  - List of Antiguan-Barbudan companies
  - List of Bahamian companies
  - List of Barbadian companies
  - List of Belizean companies
  - List of Dominican Republic companies
  - List of Grenadian companies
  - List of Guyanese companies
  - List of Haitian companies
  - List of Jamaican companies
  - List of Montserratian companies
  - List of Kittitian companies
  - List of Saint Lucian companies
  - List of Vincentian companies
  - List of Surinamese companies
  - List of Trinidadian companies
