= Index of Curaçao-related articles =

This is an alphabetical list of Curaçao-related articles.

== C ==
- Curaçao
- Curaçao International Airport
- Curaçao national football team
- Curaçao and Dependencies
- Curaçao League First Division
- Curaçao Football Federation
- Curaçao general election, 2010
- Curaçao general election, 2012

== E ==
- Economy of Curaçao

== G ==
- Government of Curaçao

== H ==
- History of Curaçao
