= List of sovereign states and dependent territories in the Caribbean =

Caribbean nations as defined by the United Nations geoscheme

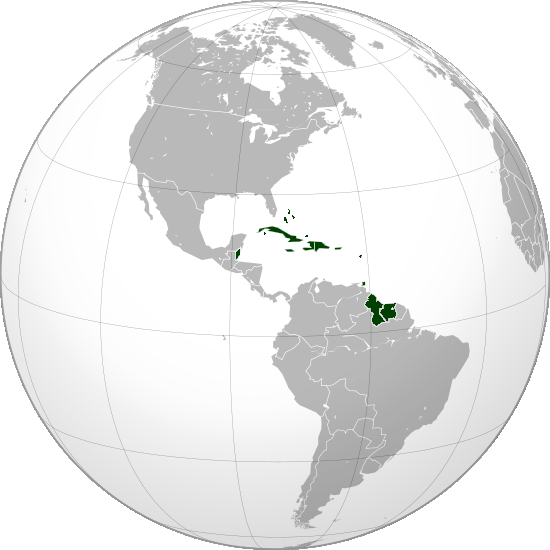
Caribbean nations in a general sense

This is a list of sovereign states and dependent territories in the Caribbean

In a general sense, the Caribbean can be taken to mean all the nations in and around the Caribbean Sea that lie within an area that stretches from The Bahamas in the north to Guyana in the south, and Suriname in the east to Belize in the west in a general sense. This is an expanse (mostly of ocean) which measures about 1,000 miles (1,600 kilometres) from north to south, and over 2,500 miles (4,000 kilometres) from east to west.

When the Central and South American nations that border the Caribbean Sea (many of which have a cultural and linguistic heritage that sets their history out of the scope of the region) are excluded, the Caribbean covers the same geographical area as the West Indies, containing a total of 13 sovereign states and 12 island territories that remain dependencies in one form or another, to the countries of France, the Netherlands, the United Kingdom, and the United States.

== Sovereign states ==
Other than Cuba and the Dominican Republic, all other 11 sovereign states (and one British Overseas Territory) in the Caribbean are member nations of the Caribbean Community, which is an international organisation formed to promote regional integration and collaboration among its member nations. Belize, Guyana, and Suriname can be considered part of the Caribbean culturally, despite Belize being geographically in Central America and Guyana and Suriname in South America.

This table only includes the countries and territories in the West Indies, which is what is generally considered to be the Caribbean as a region.

Member state of the Caribbean Community only
Member state of the Caribbean Community and the Organisation of Eastern Caribbean States

Flag	Name (official name)	Capital	Currency	Official language(s)	Area (km^{2})	Population (2021)	GDP per capita (PPP) (USD)
Antigua and Barbuda	Antigua and Barbuda	St. John's	East Caribbean dollar	None	440	93,219	21,910
The Bahamas	The Bahamas (Commonwealth of The Bahamas)	Nassau	Bahamian dollar	English	13,878	407,906	37,101
Barbados	Barbados	Bridgetown	Barbadian dollar	English	431	281,200	15,639
Cuba	Cuba (Republic of Cuba)	Havana	Cuban peso	Spanish	109,886	11,256,372	12,300
Dominica	Dominica (Republic of Dominica)	Roseau	East Caribbean dollar	English	754	72,412	11,917
Dominican Republic	Dominican Republic	Santo Domingo	Dominican peso	Spanish	48,442	11,117,873	18,413
Grenada	Grenada	St. George's	East Caribbean dollar	English	344	124,610	17,039
Haiti	Haiti (Republic of Haiti)	Port-au-Prince	Haitian gourde	French, Haitian Creole	27,750	11,447,569	2,905
Jamaica	Jamaica	Kingston	Jamaican dollar	English	10,991	2,827,695	9,762
Saint Kitts and Nevis	Saint Kitts and Nevis (Federation of Saint Christopher and Nevis)	Basseterre	East Caribbean dollar	English	261	47,606	26,438
Saint Lucia	Saint Lucia	Castries	East Caribbean dollar	English	616	179,651	15,449
Saint Vincent and the Grenadines	Saint Vincent and the Grenadines	Kingstown	East Caribbean dollar	English	389	104,332	12,485
Trinidad and Tobago	Trinidad and Tobago (Republic of Trinidad and Tobago)	Port of Spain	Trinidad and Tobago dollar	English	5,131	1,525,663	26,176

== Dependent territories ==
Montserrat is a member nation of both the Caribbean Community and the Organisation of Eastern Caribbean States despite being a dependent territory of the United Kingdom. San Andrés and Providencia; Guadeloupe and Martinique; the Caribbean Netherlands (BES islands); as well as the Federal Dependencies of Venezuela and Nueva Esparta; are not included here because they are not technically dependent territories of Colombia, France, the Netherlands, and Venezuela respectively, instead, they are integral parts of the countries abovementioned. Navassa Island, an uninhabited disputed territory administered by the United States and claimed by Haiti, is also excluded.

Member the Caribbean Community and the Organisation of Eastern Caribbean States

Flag	Name (official name)	Sovereign state	Capital	Currency	Official language(s)	Area (km^{2})	Population (2021)	GDP per capita (PPP) (USD)
Anguilla	Anguilla	United Kingdom	The Valley	East Caribbean dollar	English	91	15,753	12,200 (2008 est.)
Aruba	Aruba (Country of Aruba)	Netherlands	Oranjestad	Aruban florin	Dutch; Papiamento	180	106,537	37,500 (2017 est.)
British Virgin Islands	British Virgin Islands (Virgin Islands)	United Kingdom	Road Town	United States dollar	English	153	31,122	34,200 (2017 est.)
Cayman Islands	Cayman Islands	United Kingdom	George Town	Cayman Islands dollar	English	264	68,136	71,549 (2018 est.)
Curaçao	Curaçao (Country of Curaçao)	Netherlands	Willemstad	Caribbean guilder	Dutch; English; Papiamento	444	190,338	24,479 (2019 est.)
Montserrat	Montserrat	United Kingdom	Plymouth (de jure); Brades (de facto)	East Caribbean dollar	English	102	4,417	34,000 (2011 est.)
Puerto Rico	Puerto Rico (Commonwealth of Puerto Rico)	United States	San Juan	United States dollar	English; Spanish	9,104	3,256,028	34,518 (2019 est.)
Saint Barthélemy	Saint Barthélemy (Collectivité territoriale de Saint-Barthélemy)	France	Gustavia	Euro	French	22	7,267	
	Saint Martin (Collectivity of Saint Martin)	France	Marigot	Euro	French	54	31,530	19,300 (2005 est.)
Sint Maarten	Sint Maarten (Country of Sint Maarten)	Netherlands	Philipsburg	Caribbean guilder	Dutch; English	34	44,042	35,342 (2018 est.)
Turks and Caicos Islands	Turks and Caicos Islands	United Kingdom	Grand Turk (Cockburn Town)	United States dollar	English	616	45,114	29,253 (2019 est.)
United States Virgin Islands	U.S. Virgin Islands (Virgin Islands of the United States)	United States	Charlotte Amalie	United States dollar	English	346	100,091	37,000 (2016 est.)

== The phrase "Caribbean countries" ==
Depending on the speaker and the context, the phrase "Caribbean countries" can have a variety of meanings, such as those shown in the images below.

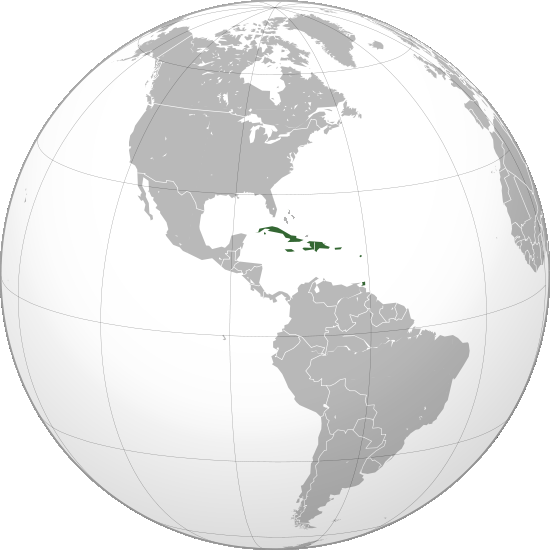
Caribbean countries in the strictest sense

Caribbean countries as defined by the United Nations geoscheme

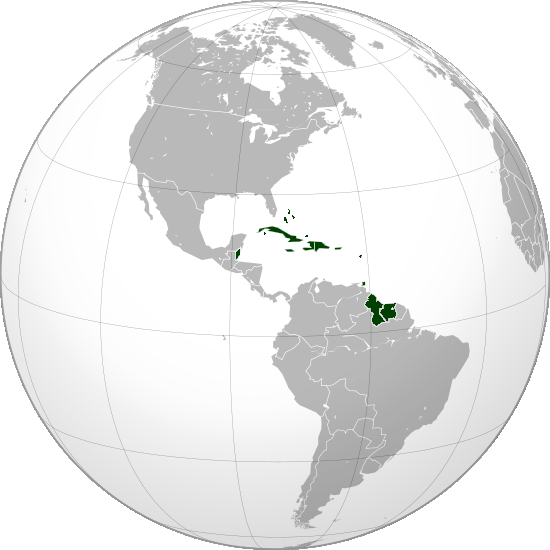
Caribbean countries in a general sense

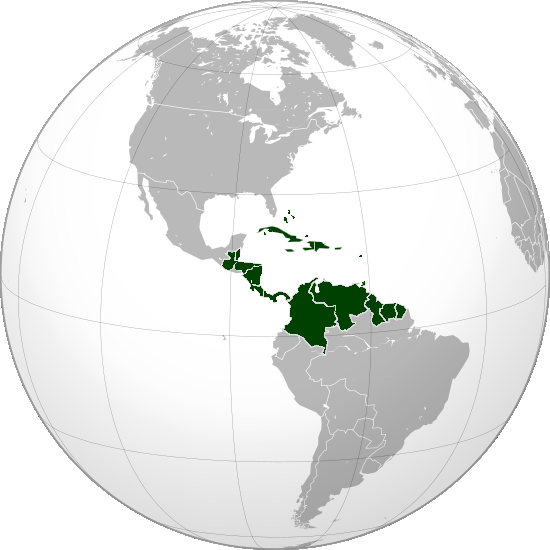
Caribbean countries in the widest application of the phrase

== See also ==
- Caribbean Free Trade Association
- Greater Antilles
- Hispanic America
- Ibero-America
- Languages of the Caribbean
- Lesser Antilles
- List of Caribbean countries by population
- Lucayan Archipelago
- West Indies
