= Fishing industry in the Caribbean =

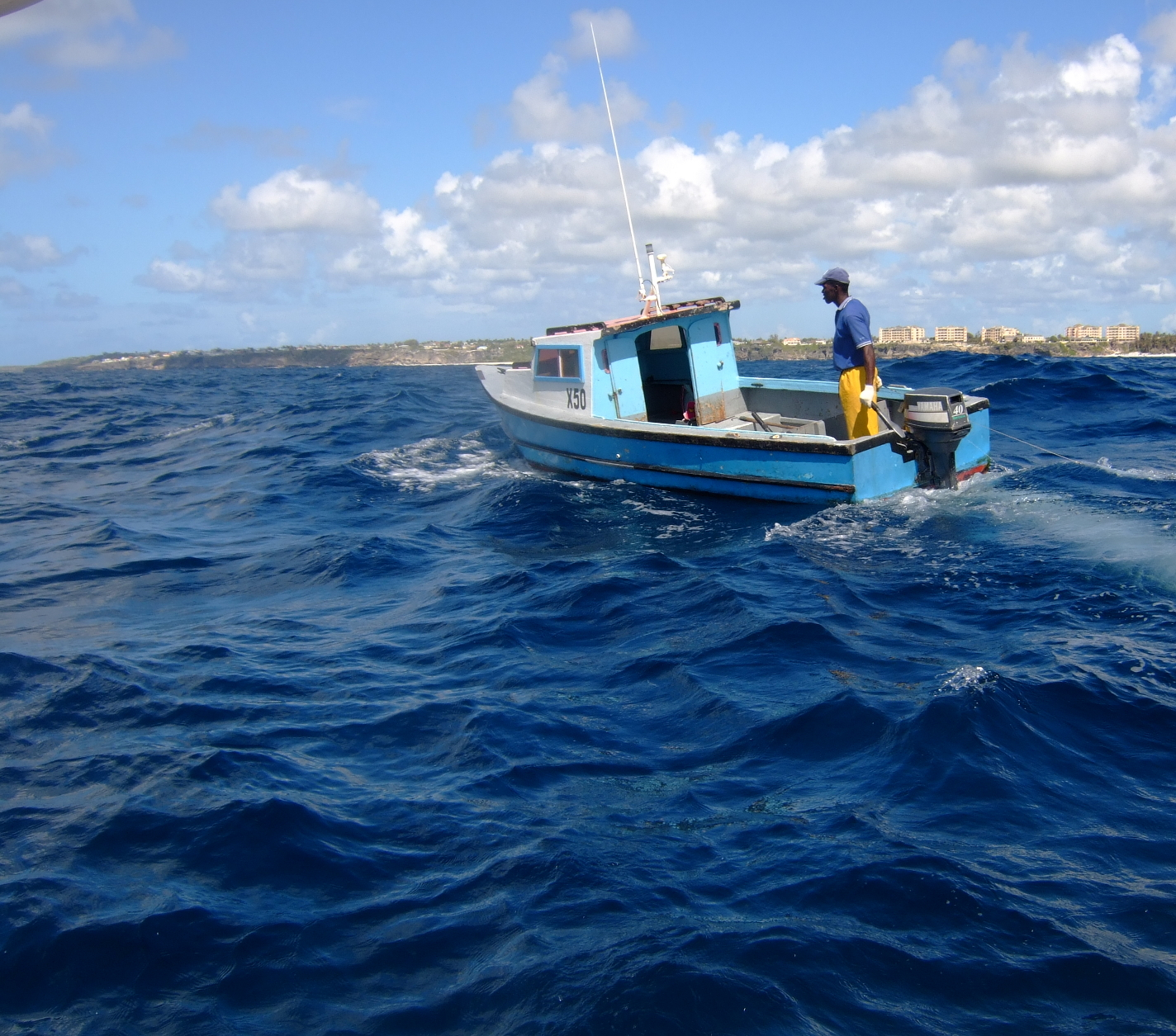
Line fishing on Cobblers Reef

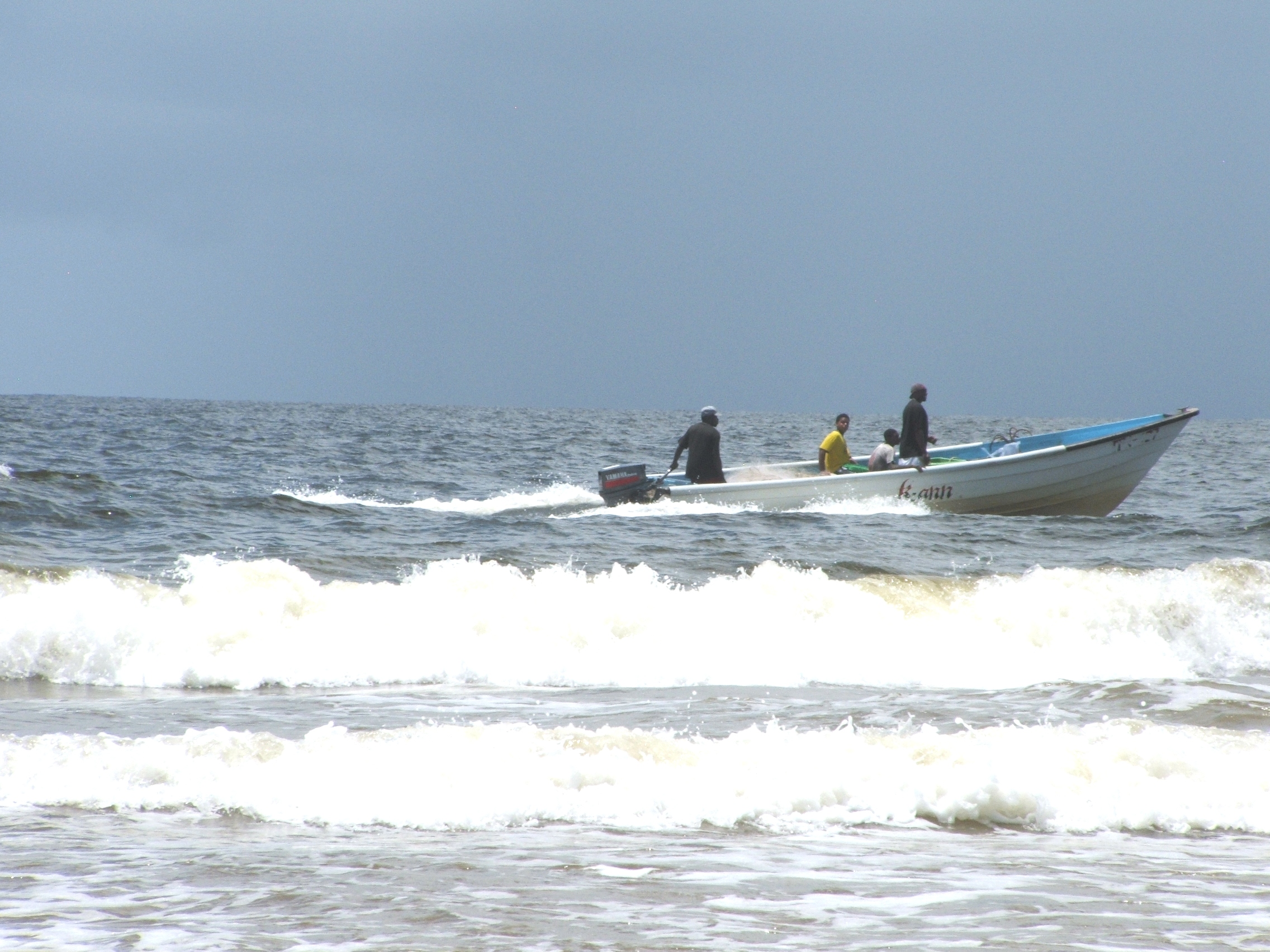
Fishing at Mayaro Bay, Trinidad and Tobago

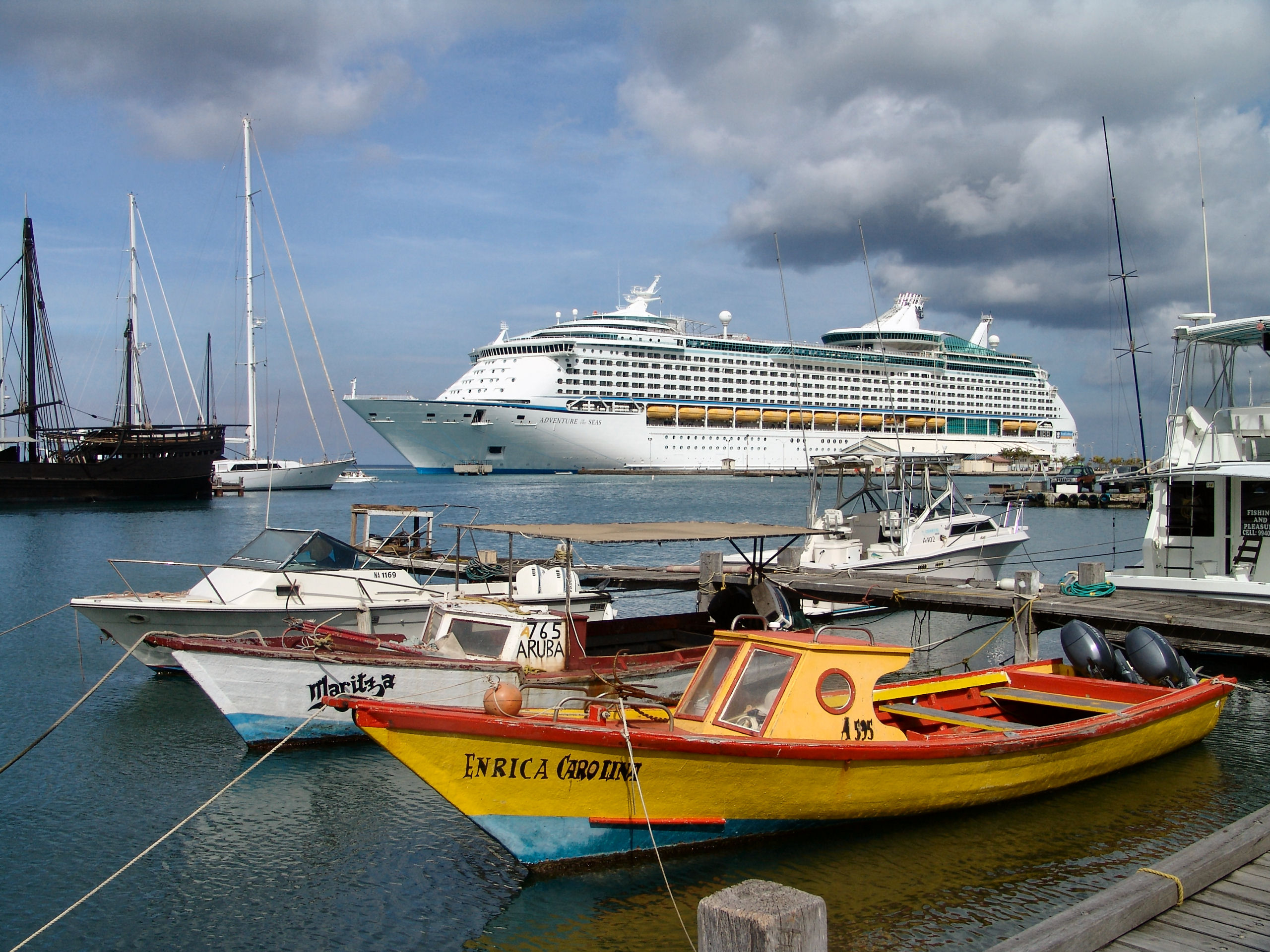
Caribbean fishing boats at Aruba

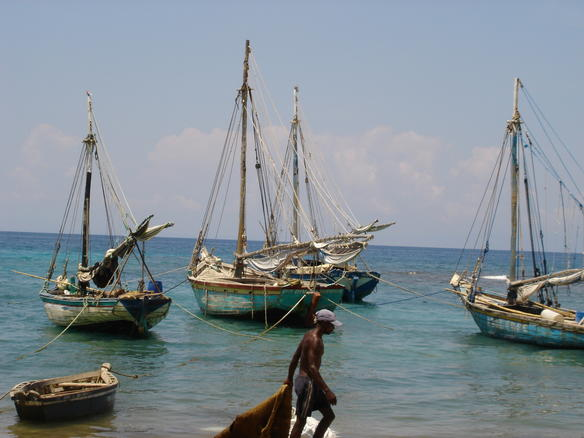
Fishing boats in the harbour of Petite Rivière de Nippes, Haiti

Although the West Indies has limited resources in terms of developing a large-scale fishing industry, the value of fish and sea products as a source of food has long been recognized. All Caribbean territories therefore have fishing industries.

Most Caribbean fishermen ply their trade from small boats (4–11 meters). These small craft, often without protection from sun or rain, are forced to remain very close to shore, seldom going more than 16 kilometers offshore.

== Methods ==
Several methods for catching fish are used:

1. Fillet (gill) nets
2. Trawling
3. Line fishing
4. Seining
5. Fish pots and reels.

The method of fishing depends on the type and size of the fish to be caught. Trawling is used to catch shrimp, carite, snapper and cavali. The main catches from seine and gill nets are king fish, shark and carite. Fish pot catches are red snappers and jacks. Fishing is a year-round activity in the Caribbean and it directly employs thousands of people.

== Sales and marketing ==
A number of different methods of selling are used in the Caribbean. Most small-scale fishermen take some of the catch for their families and sell the rest at the beach. If there is a delay between catching the fish and eating it, then some form of processing has to take place. The three processing methods that are common in the Caribbean are:

- Salting: The fish is washed, gutted, salted, then dried in the sun, or in a special electrical drying unit. Among fish salted are salt are salmon, shark, grouper and carite.
- Smoking: The fish is washed, gutted. a little salt is added, then it is partly cooked over a smoking fire. Herrings and jacks are normally preserved by this method.
- Fresh fish: The fish is washed, and passed through a machine which coats it with a film of ice. It is then wrapped in foil.

== Challenges ==
=== Overfishing ===
The fishing industry in the Caribbean is harmed by the persistent presence of illegal, unreported, and unregulated (IUU) fishing. These practices are often unsustainable to the region's aquaculture and result in lost economic benefit to the territories. For example, in February 2020, fishing in the Dominican Republic was a 93.4 million USD industry, but illegal activity by both local and foreign fishers from Honduras, Nicaragua, and South Korea have caused a deficit in fish; as a result, the country is forced to import fish that could otherwise by caught or farmed within its sovereign borders.

Aylin Ulman, a researcher at the University of British Columbia, has warned that territories such as Turks and Caicos Islands are drastically under-reporting their catches. Fishing has historically been the main industry in Turks and Caicos, involving up to 75% of locals in some areas. Tourism has contributed to greater demand for seafood, and this has placed increased pressure on marine life.
