= Caribbean Regional Maritime Agreement =

The Agreement Concerning Co-operation in Suppressing Illicit Maritime and Air Trafficking in Narcotic Drugs and Psychotropic Substances in the Caribbean Area, known in short form as the Caribbean Regional Maritime Agreement or Caribbean Regional Agreement (CRA), is a 2003 agreement regarding the suppression of the illegal drug trade in the Caribbean.

The CRA agreement has not been ratified by the required minimum five states (2007) although most Caribbean states have accepted the agreement in principle.

== Notes ==
- Singh, Rickey (7 March 2010). "Cases of 'bullying' US politics". Jamaica Observer. Archived from the original on 10 March 2010.
- P., A. (15 March 2010). "Extradition row may go to UN". Nation Newspaper.
- P., A. (15 March 2010). "'Area under US surveillance'". Nation Newspaper.

== See also ==
- Maritime drug trafficking in Latin America
- United Nations Office on Drugs and Crime
- United Nations Commission on Narcotic Drugs
