= List of North American countries by area =

Below is a list of countries and dependencies in North America by area. The region includes Canada, the Caribbean, Saint Pierre and Miquelon, Central America, Mexico, and the United States. Canada is the largest country in North America and the Western Hemisphere. Saint Kitts and Nevis is the smallest country in North America overall, while El Salvador is the smallest country on the mainland. Greenland is a dependent territory of Denmark.

	Country / dependency	% total	North America area in km^{2} (mi^{2})	
1	Canada	41%	9,984,670 (3,855,100)	
2	United States	39%	9,518,644 (3,675,167)	(Note: Excluding Hawaii and the US territories.)
	Greenland (Kingdom of Denmark)	9%	2,166,086 (836,330)	
3	Mexico	8%	1,964,375 (758,449)	
4	Nicaragua	0.5%	130,373 (50,337)	
5	Honduras	0.5%	112,492 (43,433)	
6	Cuba	0.5%	109,884 (42,426)	
7	Guatemala	0.4%	108,889 (42,042)	
8	Panama	0.3%	75,320 (29,080)	
9	Costa Rica	0.2%	51,180 (19,760)	
10	Dominican Republic	0.2%	48,671 (18,792)	
11	Haiti	0.1%	27,750 (10,710)	
12	Belize	0.1%	22,965 (8,867)	
13	El Salvador	0.1%	21,041 (8,124)	
14	The Bahamas	0.1%	13,940 (5,382)	
15	Jamaica	0.05%	10,991 (4,244)	
	Puerto Rico (US)	0.04%	8,868 (3,424)	
16	Trinidad and Tobago	0.02%	5,127 (1,980)	
	Guadeloupe (France)	0.01%	1,639 (633)	
	Martinique (France)	0.004%	1,090 (421)	
	Turks and Caicos Islands (UK)	0.004%	948 (366)	
17	Dominica	0.003%	750 (290)	
18	Saint Lucia	0.003%	616 (238)	
	Curaçao (NL)	0.002%	444 (171)	
19	Antigua and Barbuda	0.002%	442 (171)	
20	Barbados	0.002%	431 (166)	
21	Saint Vincent and the Grenadines	0.002%	389 (150)	
	US Virgin Islands (US)	0.001%	347 (134)	
22	Grenada	0.001%	345 (133)	
	Caribbean Netherlands (NL)	0.001%	328 (127)	
	Cayman Islands (UK)	0.001%	264 (102)	
23	Saint Kitts and Nevis	0.001%	261 (101)	
	Saint Pierre and Miquelon (France)	0.001%	242 (93)	
	Aruba (NL)	0.001%	180 (69)	
	British Virgin Islands (UK)	0.001%	151 (58)	
	Montserrat (UK)	0.0004%	103 (40)	
	Anguilla (UK)	0.0004%	91 (35)	
	Bermuda (UK)	0.0002%	54 (21)	
	Saint Martin (France)	0.0002%	53 (20)	
	Sint Maarten (NL)	0.0001%	34 (13)	
	Saint Barthélemy (France)	0.0001%	22 (8)	
	Clipperton Island (France)	0%	6 (2)	
	Total	100%	24,390,416 (9,417,188)	

== See also ==
- List of countries and dependencies by area
- List of North American countries by population
- List of South American countries by area
