= Outline of North America =

Overview of and topical guide to North America

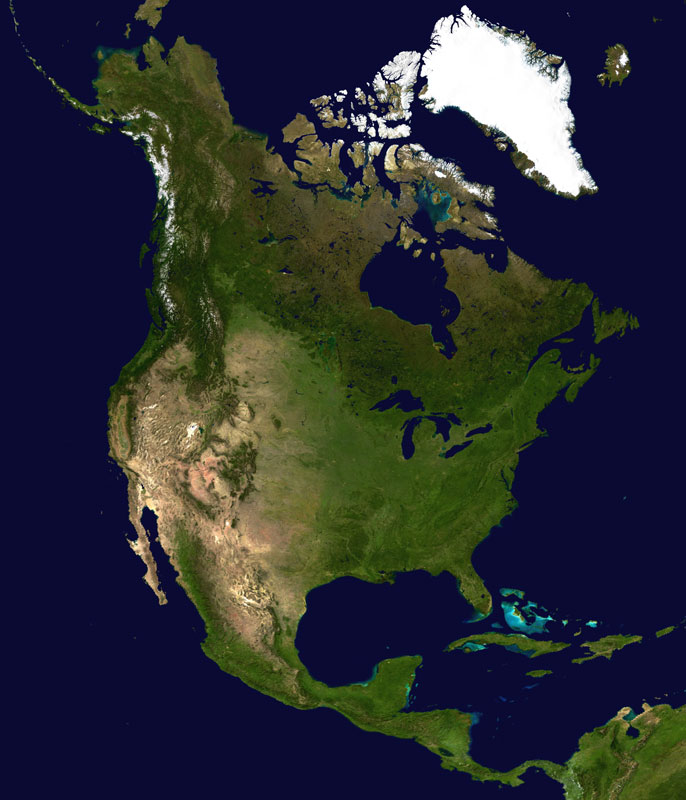
Satellite photo of North America

The following outline is provided as an overview of and topical guide to North America.

North America is a continent in the Earth's Northern and Western Hemispheres. It is bordered on the north by the Arctic Ocean, on the east by the North Atlantic Ocean, on the southeast by the Caribbean Sea, and on the south and west by the North Pacific Ocean; South America lies to the southeast. North America covers an area of about 24,709,000 square kilometres (9,540,198 sq mi), about 4.8% of the planet's surface or about 16.5% of its land area. As of July 2007, its population was estimated at nearly 524 million people. It is the third-largest continent in area, following Asia and Africa, and is fourth in population after Asia, Africa, and Europe. North America and South America are collectively known as the Americas.

== Geography of North America ==
Geography of North America

- Americas (terminology)
- Atlas of North America
- Continental divides of North America:
  - Continental Divide of the Americas
  - Eastern Continental Divide
  - Laurentian Divide
- Extreme points of North America

=== Countries and dependencies of North America ===
Anguilla • Antigua and Barbuda • Aruba • Bahamas • Barbados • Belize • Bermuda • British Virgin Islands • Canada • Cayman Islands • Clipperton Island • Costa Rica • Cuba • Curaçao • Dominica • Dominican Republic • El Salvador • Greenland • Grenada • Guadeloupe • Guatemala • Haiti • Honduras • Jamaica • Martinique • Mexico • Montserrat • Navassa Island • Nicaragua • Panama • Puerto Rico • Saint Barthélemy • Saint Kitts and Nevis • Saint Lucia • Saint Martin • Saint Pierre and Miquelon • Saint Vincent and the Grenadines • Sint Maarten • Trinidad and Tobago • Turks and Caicos Islands • United States • United States Virgin Islands

=== Regions of North America ===
United Nations geoscheme for the Americas

==== Political divisions of North America ====
Coats of arms of North America
Flags of North America
List of North American countries by GDP (PPP)
List of North American countries by population
List of cities in North America

=== Geographic features of North America ===
Table of the highest major summits of North America
Table of the most prominent summits of North America
Table of the most isolated major summits of North America

List of World Heritage Sites in the Americas

== History of North America ==
- History of the Americas
- History of Central America
- Voyages of Christopher Columbus
  - Pre-Columbian trans-oceanic contact
- History of the west coast of North America
- European colonization of the Americas
  - Timeline of colonization of North America

== Culture of North America ==
Culture of North America

- American (word)
- Etiquette in North America
  - Etiquette in Canada and the United States
  - Etiquette in Latin America
- Indigenous peoples of the Americas
- Languages of North America
  - Anglo-America
  - North American English
- World Heritage Sites in the Americas

== North America lists ==
- List of newspapers
- Lists of radio stations in North America

== See also ==
- Anglo-America
- Continent
- Index of Central America-related articles
- Latin America
- List of Caribbean-related topics
- Lists of country-related topics
- Outline of South America
