= List of countries and dependencies by area =

Dymaxion map of the world with the 30 largest countries and territories by area

This is a list of the world's countries and their dependencies, ranked by total area, including land and water.

This list includes entries that are not limited to those in the ISO 3166-1 standard, which covers sovereign states and dependent territories. All 193 member states of the United Nations plus the two observer states are given a rank number. Largely unrecognised states not in ISO 3166-1 are included in the list in ranked order. The areas of such largely unrecognised states are in most cases also included in the areas of the more widely recognised states that claim the same territory; see the notes in the "Notes" column for each country for clarification.

Not included in the list are entities such as the European Union (Note: The European Union is a unique supranational union. It covers a total area of 4,236,351 km^{2} (1,635,664 sq mi), and would be ranked 7th if it were included (3.0% of world's total land area).) which do not encompass any non-overlapping preclaimed land.

This list includes three measurements of area:

- Total area: the sum of land and water areas within international boundaries and coastlines.
- Land area: the aggregate of all land within international boundaries and coastlines, excluding water area.
- Inland water area: the sum of the surface areas of all inland water bodies (lakes, reservoirs, and rivers) within international boundaries and coastlines. Coastal internal waters may be included. Territorial seas, contiguous zones and exclusive economic zones are not included unless otherwise noted.

Total area is taken from the United Nations Statistics Division unless otherwise noted. Land and water are taken from the Food and Agriculture Organization unless otherwise noted. The CIA World Factbook is most often used when different UN departments disagree. Other sources and details for each entry may be specified in the relevant footnote.

Countries of the world by area (legend in km^{2})

== Countries and dependencies by area ==
| | Country / dependency | Total in km^{2} (mi^{2}) | Land in km^{2} (mi^{2}) | Inland water in km^{2} (mi^{2}) | % water | |
|---|---|---|---|---|---|---|
| – | Earth | 510,072,000 (196,940,000) | 148,940,000 (57,506,000) | 361,132,000 (139,434,000) | 70.8 | |
| 1 | Russia | 17,098,246 (6,601,667) | 16,376,870 (6,323,142) | 721,380 (278,530) | 4.2 | (Note: The largest country in the world, which spans two continents, and most of northern Eurasia; with about 1/9th of the world's total landmass. Russia's European portion is roughly 4,000,000 km^{2}, which is around 40% of the total landmass of Europe, making Russia the largest country in Europe; and its Asian portion, which covers all of Northern Asia, is around 13,100,000 km^{2}, making Russia the largest country in Asia.) |
| – | Antarctica | 14,200,000 (5,480,000) | 14,200,000 (5,480,000) | 0 | 0 | (Note: 98% of the land area is covered by ice and snow. The following countries have territorial claims in Antarctica: Argentina (969,000 km^{2}), Australia (5,896,500 km^{2}), Chile (1,250,000 km^{2}), France (432,000 km^{2}), New Zealand (450,000 km^{2}), Norway (including Peter I Island) (2,500,000 km^{2}) and United Kingdom (1,395,000 km^{2}), which to some extent overlap. The area from 90°W to 150°W (2,100,000 km^{2}) is unclaimed territory. These areas normally have no human inhabitants except scientists.) |
| 2 | Canada | 9,984,670 (3,855,100) | 9,093,507 (3,511,021) | 891,163 (344,080) | 8.9 | (Note: Largest country completely in the Western Hemisphere by total area (second-largest by land area after the United States); with the largest surface area of water; largest contiguous country in North America. Total area and water area figures include area covered by freshwater only and do not include internal waters (non-freshwater) of about 1,600,000 km^{2}, nor territorial waters of 200,000 km^{2}.) |
| 3 | China | 9,596,960 (3,705,410) | 9,326,410 (3,600,950) | 270,550 (104,460) | 2.8 | (Note: Largest country entirely in Asia, and second-largest country in the world by land area. Excludes Taiwan, disputed territories with India, and disputed islands in the South China Sea. Figures for total area and water area also exclude all coastal and territorial waters.) (Note: The United Nations Statistics Division, the CIA World Factbook, and the Encyclopædia Britannica all rank the United States ahead of China in total area. However, the figures used by each source include coastal and territorial waters for the United States but exclude coastal and territorial waters for China. China's coastal and territorial water figures are unknown (no official publication) and thus cannot be added into China's total area figure. But Encyclopædia Britannica specifies the United States' area excluding coastal and territorial waters as 9,525,067 km^{2}, less than the figure given for China's area by any of the three sources. Therefore, while it can be determined that China has a larger area excluding coastal and territorial waters, it is unclear which country has a larger area including coastal and territorial waters.) |
| 4 | United States | 9,525,067 (3,677,647) | 9,147,593 (3,531,904) | 377,424 (145,724) | 4.0 | (Note: Figures are from the U.S. Census and include "inland" water and "Great Lakes" water, but exclude coastal and territorial water. The NOAA cites the Great Lakes as an example of internal water, but the federal government sometimes treats the Great Lakes as "high seas".) |
| 5 | Brazil | 8,510,346 (3,285,862) | 8,460,415 (3,266,583) | 55,352 (21,372) | 0.6 | (Note: Data are from the CIA World Factbook. Largest country in South America, and largest country in the Southern Hemisphere, even discounting its territory north of the Equator.) |
| 6 | Australia | 7,741,220 (2,988,900) | 7,682,300 (2,966,200) | 58,920 (22,750) | 0.8 | (Note: Data are from the CIA World Factbook. Geoscience Australia gives an official total of 7,668,287 km^{2}. Largest country in Oceania. Figures exclude external territories. and the Australian Antarctic Territory (5,896,500 km^{2}).) |
| – | Australian Antarctic Territory (Australia) | 5,896,500 (2,276,700) | 0 (0) | 0 (0) | 0.0 | (Note: Claimed between 160°E–142°E and 136°E–44°38′E) |
| 7 | India | 3,287,263 (1,269,219) | 2,973,190 (1,147,960) | 314,070 (121,260) | 9.6 | (Note: Includes disputed territories claimed by India but not under Indian control.) |
| 8 | Argentina | 2,780,400 (1,073,500) | 2,736,690 (1,056,640) | 43,710 (16,880) | 1.6 | (Note: Data are from the CIA World Factbook. Largest Spanish-speaking country and second-largest country in South America. Excludes claims on Argentine Antarctica (969,000 km^{2}), on Malvinas/Falkland Islands (12,173 km^{2}) and on South Georgia and the South Sandwich Islands (3,903 km^{2}).) |
| 9 | Kazakhstan | 2,724,910 (1,052,090) | 2,699,700 (1,042,400) | 25,202 (9,731) | 0.9 | (Note: Largest landlocked country. Transcontinental country located in Asia and Europe.) |
| – | Queen Maud Land (Norway) | 2,700,000 (1,000,000) | 0 (0) | 0 (0) | 0.0 | |
| 10 | Algeria | 2,381,741 (919,595) | 2,381,741 (919,595) | 0 | 0 | (Note: Largest country in Africa; also largest in the Arab world and the Mediterranean Basin. The area of internal waters is officially reported as 0 even though several seasonal lakes and permanent reservoirs exist in the country.) |
| 11 | Democratic Republic of the Congo | 2,344,858 (905,354) | 2,267,048 (875,312) | 77,810 (30,040) | 3.3 | (Note: Second-largest French-speaking country. Largest country in Central and Sub-Saharan Africa. Second-largest country in Africa, has the largest French-speaking city (Kinshasa). Data are from the CIA World Factbook.) |
| – | Kingdom of Denmark | 2,210,573 (853,507) | 2,209,913 (853,252) | 660 (260) | 0.0 | (Note: Comprising the total areas of Greenland, the Faroes and mainland Denmark. Data are from the CIA World Factbook.) |
| – | Greenland (Denmark) | 2,166,086 (836,330) | 2,166,086 (836,330) | 0 | 0 | (Note: Largest island in the world, largest territory in the Kingdom of Denmark, and the largest inhabited non-sovereign territory in the world. A total of 1,755,636 km^{2} (81%) of the land area is covered by ice; the ice-free area amounts to 410,450 km^{2}. Data are from the CIA World Factbook.) |
| 12 | Saudi Arabia | 2,149,690 (830,000) | 2,149,690 (830,000) | 0 | 0 | (Note: Data are from the CIA World Factbook.) |
| 13 | Mexico | 1,964,375 (758,449) | 1,943,950 (750,563) | 20,425 (7,886) | 1.0 | |
| 14 | Indonesia | 1,904,569 (735,358) | 1,811,569 (699,450) | 93,000 (36,000) | 4.9 | (Note: Transcontinental country located in Asia and Oceania. Largest country in Southeast Asia. Largest island country and archipelagic state in the world by area and population. Data are from the CIA World Factbook.) |
| 15 | Sudan | 1,878,000 (725,100) | 1,868,000 (721,200) | 10,010 (3,865) | 0.6 | |
| 16 | Libya | 1,759,540 (679,362) | 1,759,540 (679,362) | 0 | 0 | |
| – | British Antarctic Territory (UK) | 1,709,400 (660,000) | 0 (0) | 0 (0) | 0.0 | |
| 17 | Iran | 1,648,195 (636,371) | 1,622,500 (626,450) | 25,695 (9,921) | 1.6 | (Note: Data are from the CIA The UN lists a figure of 1,628,750 km^{2}, which refers to land area only.) |
| – | Marie Byrd Land (Unclaimed) | 1,610,400 (621,780) | 0 (0) | 0 (0) | 0.0 | |
| 18 | Mongolia | 1,564,116 (603,908) | 1,557,507 (601,357) | 6,609 (2,552) | 0.4 | |
| – | Argentine Antarctica (Argentina) | 1,461,597 (564,326) | 0 (0) | 0 (0) | 0.0 | (Note: Department of Tierra del Fuego) |
| 19 | Peru | 1,285,216 (496,224) | 1,279,996 (494,209) | 5,220 (2,020) | 0.4 | |
| 20 | Chad | 1,284,000 (495,800) | 1,259,200 (486,180) | 24,800 (9,580) | 1.9 | (Note: Largest landlocked country in Africa.) |
| 21 | Niger | 1,267,000 (489,200) | 1,266,700 (489,080) | 300 (100) | 0 | |
| – | Chilean Antarctic Territory (Chile) | 1,250,268 (482,731) | 0 (0) | 0 (0) | 0 | (Note: Commune of Antártica, in the Magallanes Region) |
| 22 | Angola | 1,246,700 (481,350) | 1,246,700 (481,350) | 0 | 0 | |
| 23 | Mali | 1,240,192 (478,841) | 1,220,190 (471,118) | 20,000 (8,000) | 1.6 | |
| 24 | South Africa | 1,219,090 (470,693) | 1,214,470 (468,909) | 4,620 (1,780) | 0.4 | |
| 25 | Colombia | 1,138,910 (439,735) | 1,038,700 (401,040) | 100,210 (38,691) | 8.8 | |
| 26 | Ethiopia | 1,104,300 (426,370) | 1,096,570 (423,388) | 7,730 (2,990) | 0.7 | (Note: Excludes the Ilemi Triangle (14,000 km^{2}). Data are from the CIA World Factbook.) |
| 27 | Bolivia | 1,098,581 (424,164) | 1,083,300 (418,260) | 15,280 (5,900) | 1.4 | |
| 28 | Mauritania | 1,030,700 (397,960) | 1,030,700 (397,960) | 0 | 0 | |
| 29 | Egypt | 1,001,450 (386,662) | 995,450 (384,350) | 6,000 (2,000) | 0.6 | (Note: Transcontinental country located in Asia and Africa. Data are from the CIA World Factbook.) |
| 30 | Tanzania | 947,303 (365,756) | 885,800 (342,000) | 61,500 (23,700) | 6.5 | |
| 31 | Nigeria | 923,768 (356,669) | 910,770 (351,650) | 13,000 (5,000) | 1.4 | |
| 32 | Venezuela | 912,050 (352,140) | 882,050 (340,560) | 30,000 (10,000) | 3.3 | (Note: Excludes claims in Guyana–Venezuela territorial dispute (160,000 km^{2}). Data are from the CIA World Factbook.) |
| 33 | Pakistan | 882,363 (340,682) | 857,143 (330,945) | 25,220 (9,737) | 2.9 | (Note: Data from the CIA has been supplemented with commonly-given figures for disputed areas administered by Pakistan: Azad Kashmir (13,297 km^{2}) and Gilgit-Baltistan (72,971 km^{2}), assumed to be land.) |
| 34 | Namibia | 824,292 (318,261) | 823,290 (317,870) | 1,002 (387) | 0.1 | |
| 35 | Mozambique | 799,380 (308,640) | 786,380 (303,620) | 13,000 (5,000) | 1.6 | |
| 36 | Turkey | 783,562 (302,535) | 769,632 (297,156) | 13,930 (5,378) | 1.8 | (Note: Data are from the CIA World Factbook. Transcontinental country located in Asia and Europe.) |
| 37 | Chile | 756,102 (291,932) | 743,812 (287,187) | 12,290 (4,745) | 1.6 | (Note: Excludes claims in Antarctica. Data are from the CIA World Factbook.) |
| 38 | Zambia | 752,612 (290,585) | 743,390 (287,020) | 9,220 (3,560) | 1.2 | |
| 39 | Myanmar | 676,578 (261,228) | 653,508 (252,321) | 23,070 (8,907) | 3.4 | |
| 40 | Afghanistan | 652,864 (252,072) | 652,230 (251,830) | 630 (240) | 0.1 | |
| 41 | South Sudan | 644,329 (248,777) | | | | (Note: Figure is from the CIA and South Sudan's official site. The UN Statistics division gives a figure of 658,841, while the UN FAO gives a water area of 1,980 km^{2} and a land area of only 631,930 km^{2}. Academic articles give varying totals between 619,000 km^{2} and 658,842 km^{2}.) |
| 42 | France | 643,801 (248,573) | 640,427 (247,270) | 3,374 (1,303) | 0.5 | (Note: Figures include metropolitan France (in Europe) as well as the five overseas regions. This does not include New Caledonia, the five autonomous overseas collectivities, and the two uninhabited territories (the French Southern Territories and Clipperton Island). The Institut national de la statistique et des études économiques (National Institute for Statistics and Economic Studies), gives an area figure of 632,702 km^{2}. Largest country in the European Union.) |
| 43 | Somalia | 637,657 (246,201) | 627,340 (242,220) | 10,320 (3,985) | 1.6 | (Note: Includes Somaliland.) |
| 44 | Central African Republic | 622,984 (240,535) | 622,984 (240,535) | 0 | 0 | |
| 45 | Ukraine | 603,550 (233,030) | 579,330 (223,680) | 24,220 (9,351) | 4.0 | (Note: Includes Crimea (26,945 km^{2}) and other territories annexed by Russia but internationally recognized as part of Ukraine. 115,440 km^{2} or 19% occupied by the Russian Federation as of 22 July 2025.) |
| 46 | Madagascar | 587,041 (226,658) | 581,540 (224,530) | 5,501 (2,124) | 0.9 | |
| 47 | Botswana | 582,000 (225,000) | 566,730 (218,820) | 15,000 (5,800) | 2.6 | |
| 48 | Kenya | 580,367 (224,081) | 569,140 (219,750) | 11,227 (4,335) | 1.9 | |
| – | France (metropolitan) | 551,500 (212,900) | 549,970 (212,350) | 1,530 (591) | 0.3 | (Note: Metropolitan France (the part of France located in Europe). Data are from the CIA World Factbook.) |
| 49 | Thailand | 513,120 (198,120) | 510,890 (197,260) | 2,230 (861) | 0.4 | |
| 50 | Spain | 505,370 (195,120) | 498,980 (192,660) | 6,390 (2,470) | 1.3 | |
| 51 | Turkmenistan | 488,100 (188,500) | 469,930 (181,440) | 18,170 (7,015) | 3.7 | |
| 52 | Cameroon | 475,650 (183,650) | 472,710 (182,510) | 2,730 (1,050) | 0.6 | |
| 53 | Papua New Guinea | 462,840 (178,700) | 452,860 (174,850) | 9,980 (3,850) | 2.2 | |
| 54 | Yemen | 455,503 (175,871) | 455,503 (175,871) | 0 | 0 | (Note: Figure is from Yemen's Ministry of Water and Environment. May not include territory ceded by Saudi Arabia in the Jeddah Treaty due to the Saudi–Yemen barrier. The CIA World Factbook gives a much larger figure of 527,968 km^{2}.) |
| 55 | Sweden | 450,295 (173,860) | 407,284 (157,253) | 40,142 (15,499) | 9.0 | (Note: Data by the World Factbook.) |
| – | Ross Dependency (New Zealand) | 450,000 (170,000) | 0 (0) | 0 (0) | 0.0 | |
| 56 | Uzbekistan | 447,400 (172,700) | 425,400 (164,200) | 22,000 (8,500) | 4.9 | |
| 57 | Morocco | 446,550 (172,410) | 446,300 (172,300) | 250 (97) | 0.1 | (Note: Does not include the disputed Western Sahara, shown separately. If the whole of Western Sahara is included (which Morocco controls approximately two-thirds of), the area would be 710,800 km^{2} and the rank would be #39.) |
| 58 | Iraq | 438,317 (169,235) | 437,367 (168,868) | 950 (370) | 0.2 | (Note: Data are from the CIA World Factbook. The UN figure of 435,052 km^{2} excludes the three autonomous provinces of Iraqi Kurdistan.) |
| 59 | Paraguay | 406,752 (157,048) | 397,300 (153,400) | 9,452 (3,649) | 2.3 | |
| 60 | Zimbabwe | 390,757 (150,872) | 386,850 (149,360) | 3,910 (1,510) | 1.0 | |
| 61 | Norway | 386,224 (149,122) | 366,704 (141,585) | 19,520 (7,537) | 5.1 | (Note: Data are from the CIA World Factbook. The Kingdom of Norway, including Jan Mayen and Svalbard, but excluding Bouvet Island and the Antarctic territorial claims of Peter I Island and Queen Maud Land.) |
| 62 | Japan | 377,915 (145,914) | 364,485 (140,728) | 13,430 (5,185) | 3.6 | (Note: Data are from the CIA World Factbook. The Geospatial Information Authority of Japan gives a total of 377,975 km^{2}.) |
| 63 | Germany | 357,581 (138,063) | 349,390 (134,900) | 7,860 (3,040) | 2.2 | (Note: Before the 1990 German reunification, West Germany was 248,577 km^{2} and East Germany was 108,333 km^{2}.) |
| – | Adélie Land (France) | 351,000 (136,000) | 0 (0) | 0 (0) | 0 | (Note: Province of French Southern and Antarctic Lands) |
| 64 | Republic of the Congo | 342,000 (132,000) | 341,500 (131,900) | 500 (200) | 0.1 | |
| 65 | Finland | 338,145 (130,558) | 303,815 (117,304) | 34,330 (13,260) | 10.2 | (Note: Includes Åland (1,552 km^{2}). Data are from the CIA World Factbook.) |
| 66 | Vietnam | 331,340 (127,930) | 313,429 (121,016) | 17,801 (6,873) | 5.4 | |
| 67 | Malaysia | 330,621 (127,653) | 329,432 (127,194) | 1,190 (459) | 0.4 | |
| – | Norway (mainland) | 323,802 (125,021) | 304,282 (117,484) | 19,520 (7,537) | 6.0 | (Note: Data are from the CIA World Factbook. Excluding Bouvet Island (49 km^{2}), Jan Mayen (377 km^{2}), and Svalbard (62,045 km^{2}), shown separately, and the Antarctic territorial claims of Peter I Island (154 km^{2}) and Queen Maud Land (2,700,000 km^{2}).) |
| 68 | Ivory Coast | 322,462 (124,503) | 318,000 (123,000) | 4,460 (1,720) | 1.4 | |
| 69 | Poland | 312,685 (120,728) | 304,255 (117,473) | 8,430 (3,260) | 3.7 | |
| 70 | Oman | 309,500 (119,500) | 309,500 (119,500) | 0 | 0 | |
| 71 | Italy | 302,068 (116,629) | 295,717 (114,177) | 6,350 (2,450) | 2.1 | |
| 72 | Philippines | 300,000 (100,000) | 298,170 (115,120) | 1,830 (707) | 0.6 | (Note: The UN and CIA agree on the figure of exactly 300 thousand km^{2}, but some academic sources give a much higher total of 343,448 km^{2}.) |
| 73 | Ecuador | 283,561 (109,483) | 276,841 (106,889) | 6,720 (2,600) | 2.4 | (Note: Data are from the CIA World Factbook, which includes the Galápagos Islands (7,880 km^{2}). UN figures give a total of 257,215 km^{2}.) |
| 74 | Burkina Faso | 274,200 (105,900) | 273,800 (105,700) | 400 (200) | 0.2 | |
| 75 | New Zealand | 268,838 (103,799) | 264,537 (102,138) | 4,301 (1,661) | 1.6 | (Note: Data are from the CIA World Factbook. Figures exclude the Cook Islands, Niue, and Tokelau, shown separately, as well as the Antarctic claim of Ross Dependency.) |
| 76 | Gabon | 267,668 (103,347) | 257,670 (99,487) | 10,000 (4,000) | 3.7 | |
| – | Western Sahara (disputed) | 266,000 (103,000) | 266,000 (103,000) | 0 | 0 | |
| 77 | Guinea | 245,857 (94,926) | 245,717 (94,872) | 140 (54) | 0.1 | |
| 78 | United Kingdom | 244,376 (94,354) | 242,741 (93,723) | 1,635 (631) | 0.7 | (Note: Data is from the UK Office for National Statistics as supplied to the UN. Excludes the three Crown Dependencies (768 km^{2}) and the 14 British Overseas Territories (1,742,857 km^{2}), each shown separately.) |
| 79 | Uganda | 241,550 (93,263) | 200,520 (77,421) | 41,030 (15,840) | 17.0 | |
| 80 | Ghana | 238,537 (92,100) | 227,533 (87,851) | 11,000 (4,200) | 4.6 | |
| 81 | Romania | 238,398 (92,046) | 230,080 (88,834) | 8,320 (3,210) | 3.5 | |
| 82 | Laos | 236,800 (91,430) | 230,800 (89,110) | 6,000 (2,000) | 2.5 | (Note: Only landlocked country in Southeast Asia.) |
| 83 | Guyana | 214,969 (83,000) | 196,850 (76,004) | 18,120 (6,996) | 8.4 | |
| 84 | Belarus | 207,600 (80,160) | 202,900 (78,340) | 4,700 (1,800) | 2.3 | (Note: Data are from the CIA World Factbook. Largest landlocked country in Europe.) |
| 85 | Kyrgyzstan | 199,949 (77,201) | 191,800 (74,050) | 8,150 (3,150) | 4.1 | |
| 86 | Senegal | 196,712 (75,951) | 192,530 (74,336) | 4,180 (1,610) | 2.1 | |
| 87 | Syria | 185,180 (71,498) | 183,630 (70,900) | 1,550 (598) | 0.8 | (Note: Includes the parts of the Golan Heights (1,295 km^{2}) occupied by Israel.) |
| 88 | Cambodia | 181,035 (69,898) | 176,520 (68,155) | 4,520 (1,750) | 2.5 | |
| – | Somaliland | 177,000 (68,300) | | | | (Note: Somaliland is claimed in whole by Somalia.) |
| 89 | Uruguay | 176,215 (68,037) | 175,015 (67,574) | 1,200 (460) | 0.7 | |
| 90 | Suriname | 163,820 (63,251) | 156,000 (60,200) | 7,820 (3,020) | 4.8 | (Note: Smallest country in South America.) |
| 91 | Tunisia | 163,610 (63,170) | 155,360 (59,985) | 8,250 (3,190) | 5.0 | |
| 92 | Bangladesh | 148,460 (57,321) | 130,170 (50,259) | 18,290 (7,062) | 12.3 | (Note: Area according to Bangladesh Bureau of Statistics is 147,570 km^{2}.) |
| 93 | Nepal | 147,181 (56,827) | 143,350 (55,348) | 3,830 (1,480) | 2.6 | (Note: The Government of Nepal gives its area as 147,516 km^{2}, which includes an additional 335 square kilometers of disputed territory under Indian administration.) |
| 94 | Tajikistan | 144,100 (55,640) | 141,510 (54,637) | 2,590 (1,000) | 1.8 | |
| – | England | 132,932 (51,325) | 130,310 (50,313) | 2,622 (1,012) | 2.0 | (Note: England is a constituent country of the UK.) |
| 95 | Greece | 131,957 (50,949) | 128,900 (49,770) | 1,310 (506) | 2.3 | |
| 96 | Nicaragua | 130,373 (50,337) | 120,340 (46,464) | 10,030 (3,873) | 7.7 | (Note: Largest country in Central America.) |
| 97 | North Korea | 120,538 (46,540) | 120,410 (46,491) | 130 (50) | 0.1 | (Note: Excludes claim on South Korea.) |
| 98 | Malawi | 118,484 (45,747) | 94,080 (36,320) | 24,404 (9,422) | 20.6 | (Note: Data are from the CIA World Factbook. The UN Statistics division gives an area of 94,552 km^{2} which may exclude parts of Lake Malawi considered integral by some definitions.) |
| 99 | Eritrea | 117,600 (45,410) | 101,000 (39,000) | 16,600 (6,410) | 14.1 | (Note: Data are from the CIA World Factbook. The UN FAO gives land and water figures of 121041 km^{2} and 589 km^{2}, respectively.) |
| 100 | Benin | 114,763 (44,310) | 112,760 (43,537) | 2,000 (800) | 1.7 | |
| 101 | Honduras | 112,492 (43,433) | 111,890 (43,201) | 600 (200) | 0.5 | |
| 102 | Liberia | 111,369 (43,000) | 96,320 (37,190) | 15,049 (5,810) | 13.5 | |
| 103 | Bulgaria | 110,879 (42,811) | 108,489 (41,888) | 2,390 (923) | 2.2 | (Note: Data are from the CIA World Factbook. Largest country in the Balkans by continental area within the Balkans.) |
| 104 | Cuba | 109,884 (42,426) | 109,884 (42,426) | 0 | 0 | (Note: Largest country in the West Indies. Official area.) |
| 105 | Guatemala | 108,889 (42,042) | 107,160 (41,375) | 1,730 (668) | 1.6 | |
| 106 | Iceland | 103,000 (39,800) | 100,830 (38,931) | 2,170 (838) | 2.1 | |
| 107 | South Korea | 100,432 (38,777) | 97,600 (37,700) | 2,800 (1,100) | 2.8 | (Note: Excludes claim on North Korea.) |
| 108 | Hungary | 93,025 (35,917) | 91,260 (35,240) | 1,770 (683) | 1.9 | |
| 109 | Portugal | 92,090 (35,560) | 91,470 (35,320) | 620 (240) | 0.45 | |
| 110 | Jordan | 89,318 (34,486) | 88,794 (34,284) | 524 (202) | 0.6 | |
| 111 | Serbia | 88,499 (34,170) | 88,499 (34,170) | 0 | 0 | (Note: Figures are official and include Serbia's claim on Kosovo. The 2023 Statistical Yearbook describes its figure as "provisional" and "land area". The UN FAO estimates some 900 km^{2} of water area. The CIA World Factbook gives separate figures for Serbia (77,474 km^{2}) and Kosovo (10,877 km^{2}).) |
| 112 | Azerbaijan | 86,600 (33,400) | 82,650 (31,910) | 3,950 (1,530) | 4.6 | (Note: Largest country in the Caucasus. Transcontinental country located in Asia and Europe.) |
| 113 | Austria | 83,878 (32,385) | 82,520 (31,860) | 1,359 (525) | 1.6 | |
| 114 | United Arab Emirates | 83,600 (32,300) | 82,880 (32,000) | 720 (280) | 0.9 | (Note: Total figure is official sum of provinces, land area is official and water area is implied, excluding some of the reported 27,625 km^{2} of "territorial water". The UN replicates the land-only figure while the CIA reports 83,600 km^{2} of land and no water.) |
| – | Scotland | 80,231 (30,977) | 77,901 (30,078) | 2,330 (900) | 2.9 | (Note: Scotland is a constituent country of the UK.) |
| 115 | Czech Republic | 78,871 (30,452) | 77,187 (29,802) | 1,684 (650) | 2.1 | |
| 116 | Panama | 75,320 (29,080) | 74,180 (28,640) | 1,143 (441) | 1.5 | |
| 117 | Sierra Leone | 72,300 (27,900) | 72,180 (27,870) | 120 (46) | 0.2 | |
| 118 | Ireland | 70,273 (27,133) | 68,883 (26,596) | 1,390 (537) | 2.0 | (Note: The figure shown is for the Republic of Ireland; the island of Ireland is 84,421 km^{2}.) |
| 119 | Georgia | 69,700 (26,900) | 69,490 (26,830) | 210 (81) | 0.3 | (Note: Transcontinental country located in Asia and Europe. The figure shown includes Abkhazia (8,665 km^{2}) and South Ossetia (3,900 km^{2}), both de facto independent from Georgia.) |
| 120 | Sri Lanka | 67,240 (25,960) | 61,860 (23,880) | 3,750 (1,450) | 5.7 | |
| 121 | Lithuania | 65,286 (25,207) | 62,610 (24,170) | 2,680 (1,040) | 4.1 | |
| 122 | Latvia | 64,594 (24,940) | 62,230 (24,030) | 2,370 (915) | 3.7 | |
| – | Svalbard (Norway) | 62,045 (23,956) | 62,045 (23,956) | 0 | 0 | (Note: The UN gives a combined area for Svalbard and Jan Mayen as 62,422 km^{2}. The separate figures shown are from the CIA World Factbook.) |
| 123 | Togo | 56,785 (21,925) | 54,390 (21,000) | 2,400 (930) | 4.2 | |
| 124 | Croatia | 56,594 (21,851) | 55,974 (21,612) | 620 (240) | 1.1 | |
| 125 | Bosnia and Herzegovina | 51,209 (19,772) | 51,200 (19,800) | 10 (4) | 0.0 | |
| 126 | Costa Rica | 51,180 (19,760) | 51,140 (19,750) | 40 (20) | 0.1 | |
| 127 | Slovakia | 49,035 (18,933) | 48,080 (18,560) | 950 (370) | 1.9 | |
| 128 | Dominican Republic | 48,670 (18,790) | 48,320 (18,660) | 350 (140) | 0.7 | |
| 129 | Estonia | 45,339 (17,505) | 42,388 (16,366) | 2,840 (1,100) | 6.3 | |
| 130 | Denmark | 42,947 (16,582) | 42,434 (16,384) | 660 (260) | 1.5 | (Note: Includes Denmark proper only, but excludes the autonomous territories in the Kingdom of Denmark, shown separately.) |
| 131 | Netherlands | 41,865 (16,164) | 33,893 (13,086) | 7,650 (2,950) | 19.0 | (Note: Data are from the CIA World Factbook and are for Netherlands proper, which includes the Caribbean Netherlands. May include coastal water. Excludes Aruba, Curaçao and Sint Maarten. The Kingdom of the Netherlands totals to 42,201 km^{2}.) |
| 132 | Switzerland | 41,291 (15,943) | 39,510 (15,260) | 1,781 (688) | 4.3 | |
| 133 | Bhutan | 38,394 (14,824) | 38,140 (14,730) | 250 (97) | 0.7 | |
| 134 | Guinea-Bissau | 36,125 (13,948) | 28,120 (10,860) | 8,010 (3,090) | 22.2 | |
| – | Taiwan | 35,980 (13,890) | 32,260 (12,460) | 3,720 (1,440) | 10.3 | (Note: Data are from the CIA World Factbook. Excludes claim on mainland China. Taiwan's official figure is 36,197 km^{2} of land area.) |
| 135 | Moldova | 33,847 (13,068) | 32,970 (12,730) | 880 (340) | 2.6 | (Note: The figure shown includes the area of Transnistria (4,163 km^{2}), which is de facto independent from Moldova.) |
| 136 | Belgium | 30,528 (11,787) | 30,280 (11,690) | 250 (97) | 0.8 | |
| 137 | Lesotho | 30,355 (11,720) | 30,355 (11,720) | 0 | 0 | |
| 138 | Armenia | 29,743 (11,484) | 28,470 (10,990) | 1,270 (490) | 4.3 | |
| 139 | Solomon Islands | 28,896 (11,157) | 27,990 (10,810) | 910 (350) | 3.1 | |
| 140 | Albania | 28,748 (11,100) | 27,400 (10,600) | 330 (130) | 1.1 | |
| 141 | Equatorial Guinea | 28,051 (10,831) | 28,051 (10,831) | 0 | 0 | |
| 142 | Burundi | 27,834 (10,747) | 25,680 (9,915) | 2,150 (830) | 7.7 | |
| 143 | Haiti | 27,750 (10,710) | 27,560 (10,640) | 190 (73) | 0.7 | |
| 144 | Rwanda | 26,338 (10,169) | 24,670 (9,525) | 1,670 (645) | 6.3 | |
| 145 | North Macedonia | 25,713 (9,928) | 25,220 (9,737) | 490 (190) | 1.9 | |
| 146 | Djibouti | 23,200 (8,960) | 23,180 (8,950) | 20 (8) | 0.1 | |
| 147 | Belize | 22,965 (8,867) | 22,810 (8,807) | 160 (62) | 0.7 | |
| 148 | Israel | 21,937 (8,470) | 21,497 (8,300) | 440 (170) | 2.1 | (Note: Data are from the CIA World Factbook. The UN/Israel Central Bureau of Statistics figure of 22,072 km^{2} includes the Golan Heights (1,200 km^{2}) and East Jerusalem (70 km^{2}), which are not internationally recognised as part of Israel.) |
| – | Wales | 21,218 (8,192) | 20,737 (8,007) | 481 (186) | 2.3 | (Note: Wales is a constituent country of the UK.) |
| 149 | El Salvador | 21,041 (8,124) | 20,720 (8,000) | 320 (120) | 1.5 | (Note: Smallest country on the American continent.) |
| 150 | Slovenia | 20,273 (7,827) | 20,151 (7,780) | 122 (47) | 0.6 | |
| – | New Caledonia (France) | 18,575 (7,172) | 18,275 (7,056) | 300 (100) | 1.6 | |
| 151 | Fiji | 18,272 (7,055) | 18,272 (7,055) | 0 | 0 | |
| 152 | Kuwait | 17,818 (6,880) | 17,818 (6,880) | 0 | 0 | |
| 153 | Eswatini | 17,363 (6,704) | 17,200 (6,640) | 160 (62) | 0.9 | |
| 154 | Timor-Leste | 14,874 (5,743) | 14,874 (5,743) | 0 | 0 | |
| – | Northern Ireland | 14,330 (5,533) | 13,547 (5,231) | 783 (302) | 5.5 | (Note: Northern Ireland is a constituent country of the UK.) |
| 155 | Montenegro | 13,888 (5,362) | 13,450 (5,193) | 438 (169) | 3.2 | |
| 156 | Bahamas | 13,880 (5,359) | 10,010 (3,865) | 3,870 (1,490) | 27.8 | |
| 157 | Vanuatu | 12,189 (4,706) | 12,189 (4,706) | 0 | 0 | |
| – | Falkland Islands (UK) | 12,173 (4,700) | 12,173 (4,700) | 0 | 0 | |
| 158 | Qatar | 11,586 (4,473) | 11,586 (4,473) | 0 | 0 | |
| 159 | The Gambia | 11,295 (4,361) | 10,120 (3,907) | 1,180 (456) | 10.4 | (Note: Smallest country in continental Africa.) |
| 160 | Jamaica | 10,991 (4,244) | 10,830 (4,181) | 160 (62) | 1.5 | |
| – | Kosovo | 10,887 (4,203) | 10,887 (4,203) | 0 | 0 | |
| 161 | Lebanon | 10,452 (4,036) | 10,230 (3,950) | 220 (85) | 2.1 | |
| 162 | Cyprus | 9,251 (3,572) | 9,241 (3,568) | 10 (4) | 0.1 | (Note: Includes the largely unrecognized but de facto independent Northern Cyprus (3,355 km^{2}), the UN buffer zone (346 km^{2}) and Akrotiri and Dhekelia (254 km^{2}).) |
| – | Puerto Rico (US) | 9,100 (3,500) | 8,868 (3,424) | 232 (89) | 2.5 | |
| – | Abkhazia | 8,665 (3,346) | | | | (Note: Abkhazia is claimed in whole by Georgia, and has limited international recognition.) |
| – | French Southern Territories (France) | 7,747 (2,991) | 7,668 (2,961) | 80 (30) | 1.0 | (Note: Excludes claim on Adélie Land in Antarctica. Data are from the CIA World Factbook.) |
| 163 | Palestine | 6,020 (2,320) | 6,025 (2,326) | 0 | 0 | (Note: The CIA World Factbook gives the areas of the West Bank and the Gaza Strip separately as 5,860 km^{2} and 360 km^{2} respectively. The figure for the West Bank includes East Jerusalem and Jerusalem No Man's Land, but excludes Mount Scopus. The UN source differs by 200 km^{2} and may exclude the area of the Dead Sea pertaining to the West Bank.) |
| 164 | Brunei | 5,765 (2,226) | 5,270 (2,040) | 500 (200) | 8.7 | |
| 165 | Trinidad and Tobago | 5,127 (1,980) | 5,131 (1,981) | 0 | 0 | |
| – | French Polynesia (France) | 4,167 (1,609) | 3,827 (1,478) | 340 (130) | 8.2 | |
| – | Transnistria | 4,163 (1,607) | | | | (Note: Transnistria is claimed in whole by Moldova, and has limited international recognition) |
| 166 | Cape Verde | 4,033 (1,557) | 4,033 (1,557) | 0 | 0 | |
| – | South Georgia and the South Sandwich Islands (UK) | 3,903 (1,507) | 3,903 (1,507) | 0 | 0 | |
| – | South Ossetia | 3,900 (1,500) | | | | (Note: South Ossetia is claimed in whole by Georgia.) |
| – | Northern Cyprus | 3,355 (1,295) | | | | (Note: Academic articles most frequently give the figure shown, while an official brochure gives 3,248 km^{2}. Turkish Republic of Northern Cyprus is a self-declared state recognised only by Turkey.) |
| 167 | Samoa | 2,842 (1,097) | 2,780 (1,070) | 10 (4) | 0.4 | |
| 168 | Luxembourg | 2,586 (998) | 2,574 (994) | 16 (6) | 0.6 | |
| 169 | Mauritius | 2,096 (809) | 2,086 (805) | 10 (4) | 0.5 | (Note: Data are from the CIA World Factbook. The UN figure of 1,969 km^{2} excludes the Agaléga Islands and Saint Brandon (Cargados Carajos).) |
| 170 | Comoros | 1,861 (719) | 1,861 (719) | 0 | 0 | (Note: All figures are from the UN FAO. The CIA and the UN Statistics department give an area of 2,235 km^{2}, which includes Mayotte (374 km^{2}), an overseas department and region of France.) |
| – | Åland (Finland) | 1,581 (610) | 1,553 (600) | 28 (11) | 1.8 | (Note: Åland is an autonomous region of Finland, and thus is a part of the European Union.) |
| – | Faroe Islands (Denmark) | 1,393 (538) | 1,393 (538) | 0 | 0 | |
| – | Hong Kong (China) | 1,114 (430) | 1,050 (405) | 60 (20) | 5.4 | (Note: UN figures are given, including only land and internal water. Official figures include "sea area" of 1,640 km^{2}.) |
| 171 | São Tomé and Príncipe | 964 (372) | 964 (372) | 0 | 0 | |
| – | Turks and Caicos Islands (UK) | 948 (366) | 948 (366) | 0 | 0 | |
| 172 | Kiribati | 811 (313) | 811 (313) | 0 | 0 | (Note: Data are from the CIA World Factbook. The UN figure of 726 km^{2} excludes 84 km^{2} of uninhabited islands.) |
| 173 | Bahrain | 778 (300) | 778 (300) | 0 | 0 | (Note: Due to ongoing extensive land reclamation, Bahrain's total land area is variable and depends on the source and year of publication, typically ranging from 740 km^{2} to 780 km^{2} during the 2010s and 2020s. The CIA World Factbook reports a figure of 760 km^{2} excluding territorial waters, the United Nations Statistics Division lists 778 km^{2}, the UN FAO gives 790 km^{2} excluding territorial waters, while Bahrain's official figure is 786.5 km^{2}, also excluding territorial waters.) |
| 174 | Dominica | 750 (290) | 750 (290) | 0 | 0 | |
| 175 | Tonga | 747 (288) | 720 (280) | 30 (10) | 4.0 | |
| 176 | Singapore | 745 (288) | 735 (284) | 10 (4) | 1.4 | (Note: Due to ongoing extensive land reclamation, Singapore's total land area is variable and depends on the source and year of publication, typically ranging from 740 km^{2} to 770 km^{2} during the 2010s and 2020s. The most recent figures are sourced from the Singapore Department of Statistics, which operates under the Ministry of Trade and Industry of the Government of Singapore.) |
| 177 | Micronesia | 702 (271) | 700 (270) | 0 | 0 | |
| 178 | Saint Lucia | 616 (238) | 610 (240) | 10 (4) | 1.6 | |
| – | Isle of Man (UK) | 572 (221) | 570 (220) | 0 | 0 | |
| – | Guam (US) | 541 (209) | 540 (210) | 0 | 0 | |
| 179 | Andorra | 468 (181) | 468 (181) | 0 | 0 | (Note: European microstate.) |
| 180 | Palau | 459 (177) | 459 (177) | 0 | 0 | |
| – | Northern Mariana Islands (US) | 457 (176) | 457 (176) | 0 | 0 | |
| 181 | Seychelles | 457 (176) | 457 (176) | 0 | 0 | (Note: Smallest country in Africa.) |
| – | Curaçao (Netherlands) | 444 (171) | 444 (171) | 0 | 0 | (Note: Data are from official statistics.) |
| 182 | Antigua and Barbuda | 442 (171) | 442 (171) | 0 | 0 | |
| 183 | Barbados | 431 (166) | 431 (166) | 0 | 0 | |
| – | Heard Island and McDonald Islands (Australia) | 412 (159) | 412 (159) | 0 | 0 | |
| – | Saint Helena, Ascension and Tristan da Cunha (UK) | 394 (152) | 394 (152) | 0 | 0 | (Note: Comprising Saint Helena (122 km^{2}), Ascension Island (88 km^{2}), and Tristan da Cunha (184 km^{2}). Data are from the CIA World Factbook.) |
| 184 | Saint Vincent and the Grenadines | 389 (150) | 389 (150) | 0 | 0 | |
| – | Jan Mayen (Norway) | 377 (146) | 377 (146) | 0 | 0 | |
| – | U.S. Virgin Islands (US) | 347 (134) | 347 (134) | 0 | 0 | |
| 185 | Grenada | 345 (133) | 340 (130) | 0 | 0 | |
| 186 | Malta | 315 (122) | 315 (122) | 0 | 0 | (Note: European microstate. Smallest European Union member state.) |
| 187 | Maldives | 300 (116) | 300 (116) | 0 | 0 | (Note: Smallest country in Asia.) |
| – | Bonaire (Netherlands) | 288 (111) | 288 (111) | 0 | 0 | |
| – | Cayman Islands (UK) | 264 (102) | 264 (102) | 0 | 0 | |
| 188 | Saint Kitts and Nevis | 261 (101) | 261 (101) | 0 | 0 | (Note: Smallest country in the Americas and the Western Hemisphere.) |
| – | Niue | 260 (100) | 260 (100) | 0 | 0 | |
| – | Akrotiri and Dhekelia (UK) | 254 (98) | | | | (Note: Comprises Akrotiri (123 km^{2}) and Dhekelia (131 km^{2}), together making up 3% of the island of Cyprus.) |
| – | Saint Pierre and Miquelon (France) | 242 (93) | 230 (89) | 10 (4) | 4.2 | |
| – | Cook Islands | 236 (91) | 236 (91) | 0 | 0 | |
| – | American Samoa (US) | 199 (77) | 199 (77) | 0 | 0 | |
| 189 | Marshall Islands | 181 (70) | 180 (69) | 0 | 0 | |
| – | Aruba (Netherlands) | 180 (69) | 180 (69) | 0 | 0 | |
| – | Easter Island (Chile) | 163 (63) | 163 (63) | 0 | 0 | (Note: Various sources give figures between 161 km^{2} and 166 km^{2}.) |
| 190 | Liechtenstein | 160 (62) | 160 (62) | 0 | 0 | (Note: European microstate.) |
| – | Peter I Island (Norway) | 154 (59) | 0 (0) | 0 (0) | 0.0 | |
| – | British Virgin Islands (UK) | 151 (58) | 151 (58) | 0 | 0 | |
| – | Wallis and Futuna (France) | 142 (55) | 142 (55) | 0 | 0 | |
| – | Christmas Island (Australia) | 135 (52) | 135 (52) | 0 | 0 | |
| – | Jersey (UK) | 116 (45) | 116 (45) | 0 | 0 | |
| – | Montserrat (UK) | 103 (40) | 100 (40) | 0 | 0 | |
| – | Anguilla (UK) | 91 (35) | 91 (35) | 0 | 0 | |
| – | Guernsey (UK) | 78 (30) | 78 (30) | 0 | 0 | |
| 191 | San Marino | 61 (24) | 61 (24) | 0 | 0 | (Note: European microstate.) |
| – | British Indian Ocean Territory (UK) | 60 (23) | 60 (23) | 0 | 0 | |
| – | Bermuda (UK) | 54 (21) | 54 (21) | 0 | 0 | |
| – | Saint Martin (France) | 53 (20) | 53 (20) | 0 | 0 | |
| – | Bouvet Island (Norway) | 49 (19) | 49 (19) | 0 | 0 | |
| – | Pitcairn Islands (UK) | 47 (18) | 47 (18) | 0 | 0 | (Note: The figure shown is from the CIA Factbook, and includes Henderson, Ducie, and Oeno Island. The UN figure is 5 km^{2}, and only includes area for Pitcairn island itself, the only inhabited island in the group.) |
| – | Norfolk Island (Australia) | 36 (14) | 36 (14) | 0 | 0 | |
| – | Sint Maarten (Netherlands) | 34 (13) | 34 (13) | 0 | 0 | |
| – | U.S. Minor Outlying Islands (US) | 34 (13) | 34 (13) | 0 | 0 | (Note: Includes CIA figures of Wake Island, Navassa Island and all of the United States Pacific Island Wildlife Refuges. May exclude some lagoon water or classify lagoon water as land.) |
| – | Macau (China) | 33 (13) | 33 (13) | 0 | 0 | |
| 192 | Tuvalu | 26 (10) | 26 (10) | 0 | 0 | |
| – | Saint Barthélemy (France) | 22 (8) | 20 (8) | 0 | 0 | |
| 193 | Nauru | 21 (8) | 20 (8) | 0 | 0 | (Note: Smallest island country, and smallest country that is not a city-state.) |
| – | Sint Eustatius (Netherlands) | 21 (8) | | | | |
| – | Cocos (Keeling) Islands (Australia) | 14 (5) | 14 (5) | 0 | 0 | |
| – | Saba (Netherlands) | 13 (5) | | | | |
| – | Tokelau (New Zealand) | 12 (5) | 12 (5) | 0 | 0 | |
| – | Gibraltar (UK) | 6.8 (2.6) | 6.8 (2.6) | 0 | 0 | (Note: Land figure is official while the CIA states zero water area.) |
| – | Clipperton Island (France) | 6.0 (2.3) | 2.0 (0.77) | 4.0 (1.5) | 66.7 | (Note: The CIA World Factbook gives a total area of 6 km^{2} and no water, but Britannica gives a land area of 2 km^{2} and Coral Reefs has given a water area of 4 km^{2}.) |
| – | Ashmore and Cartier Islands (Australia) | 5.0 (1.9) | 5.0 (1.9) | 0 | 0 | |
| – | Coral Sea Islands (Australia) | 3.0 (1.2) | 3.0 (1.2) | 0 | 0 | (Note: The CIA World Factbook gives an estimate of less than 3 km^{2}. The territory comprises many low atolls and reefs, spanning some 780,000 km^{2} of territorial water.) |
| – | Spratly Islands (disputed) | 2.0 (0.77) | 2.0 (0.77) | 0 | 0 | |
| 194 | Monaco | 2.0 (0.77) | 2.0 (0.77) | 0 | 0 | (Note: European microstate. Smallest United Nations member state.) |
| 195 | Vatican City | 0.44 (0.17) | 0.44 (0.17) | 0 | 0 | (Note: European microstate. Smallest country in the world. The De Agostini Atlas Calendar listed the area of Vatican City as 0.44 km^{2} in its 1930 edition but corrected it to 0.49 km^{2} in its 1945–46 edition. However, the figure of 0.44 km^{2} is widely cited by many sources (e.g. Encyclopedia Britannica) and it is the official figure.) |

== See also ==
- List of countries and dependencies by population density
- List of countries and dependencies by population
- List of largest cities
- List of largest empires
- Lists of political and geographic subdivisions by total area
- List of sovereign states
- Orders of magnitude (area)
- regional lists:
  - List of African countries by area
  - List of Asian countries by area
  - List of European countries by area
  - List of North American countries by area
  - List of Oceanian countries by area
  - List of South American countries by area
