= List of Asian countries by population growth rate =

The list is based on CIA World Factbook estimates for the year 2023. All sovereign states with United Nations membership and territory in Asia are included on the list apart from those who are also members of the Council of Europe. In addition, the list includes the special administrative regions of China (Hong Kong and Macao).

== List ==
Annual Population Growth Rates in Asia (2025)

Rank	Country	Annual growth (%)
1	Afghanistan	2.86
2	Yemen	2.22
3	Iraq	1.94
4	Tajikistan	1.89
5	Pakistan	1.82
6	Saudi Arabia	1.72
7	Oman	1.70
8	Jordan	1.68
9	Syria	1.63
10	Israel	1.59
11	Brunei	1.37
13	Timor-Leste	1.28
14	Uzbekistan	1.26
15	Laos	1.22
16	Mongolia	1.08
17	Kuwait	1.07
18	Malaysia	0.97
19	Cambodia	0.95
20	Bhutan	0.93
21	Bangladesh	0.91
22	Turkmenistan	0.88
23	Vietnam	0.86
24	Singapore	0.85
25	Kazakhstan	0.83
26	Bahrain	0.79
27	Kyrgyzstan	0.75
28	Philippines	0.74
29	India	0.72
30	Indonesia	0.70
31	Myanmar	0.69
32	Nepal	0.66
33	Macau	0.64
34	United Arab Emirates	0.62
35	Qatar	0.57
36	Korea, North	0.40
37	Sri Lanka	0.22
38	Thailand	0.13
39	HKG	0.09
40	Taiwan	0.02
41	China	-0.08
42	South Korea	-0.09
43	Maldives	-0.24
44	Japan	-0.45
45	Armenia	-0.45
46	Georgia	-0.45
47	Lebanon	-0.77
48	Iran	-0.87

== Regions ==
Middle East

Rank	Country	Annual growth (%)
1	Iraq	2.87
2	Qatar	2.64
3	United Arab Emirates	2.47
4	Yemen	2.37
5	Bahrain	2.33
6	Oman	2.05
7	Syria	1.56
8	Israel	1.53
8	Kuwait	1.53
10	Saudi Arabia	1.46
11	Iran	1.18
12	Jordan	0.83

South Asia

Rank	Country	Annual growth (%)
1	Afghanistan	2.34
2	Pakistan	1.45
3	Nepal	1.24
4	India	1.19
5	Bhutan	1.09
6	Bangladesh	1.05
7	Sri Lanka	0.80
8	Maldives	-0.07

Southeast Asia

Rank	Country	Annual growth (%)
1	Laos	1.37
2	Cambodia	1.23
3	Malaysia	1.23
4	Timor-Leste	1.18
5	Philippines	0.83
6	Brunei	0.82
7	Indonesia	0.82
8	Singapore	0.75
9	Myanmar	0.68
10	Vietnam	0.63
11	Thailand	-0.05

== See also ==
- List of Asian countries by population
