= List of Asian countries by area =

Geographical ranking of Asian countries

Below is the list of countries in Asia by area. Russia is the largest country in Asia and the world, even after excluding its European portion. Maldives is the smallest country in Asia.

	Country / dependency	% total	Asia area in km^{2} (mi^{2})	
1	Russia	29.3%	13,083,100 (5,051,400)	(Note: Figure is for the 3 districts in Northern Asia. Total area is 17,098,246 (6,601,670) including European Russia. Largest country in the world by area.)
2	China	21.5%	9,596,961 (3,705,407)	(Note: Excluding Taiwan, Hong Kong and Macau.)
3	India	7.4%	3,287,263 (1,269,219)	
4	Kazakhstan	5.8%	2,600,000 (1,000,000)	(Note: Nine districts totaling 122,176 (47,172) are entirely in Europe and four districts totaling 52,638 (20,324) are partially in Europe. The Asia figure given includes entire districts with significant portions in Asia, with significant figures reduced to reflect the uncertainty. Total area is 2,724,900 (1,052,100) including European part, west of the Ural River. Largest landlocked country in the world.)
5	Saudi Arabia	4.8%	2,149,690 (830,000)	
6	Iran	3.7%	1,648,195 (636,372)	
7	Mongolia	3.5%	1,564,110 (603,910)	
8	Indonesia	3.3%	1,488,509 (574,717)	(Note: Figure excludes two provinces in Western New Guinea. Total area is 1,904,569 (735,358) including Western New Guinea in Oceania. Largest island country in the world.)
9	Pakistan	2.0%	881,913 (340,509)	
10	Turkey	1.7%	759,805 (293,362)	(Note: Figure excludes 3 provinces and 28 districts in Europe. Total area is 783,562 (302,535) including European Turkey.)
11	Myanmar	1.5%	676,578 (261,228)	
12	Afghanistan	1.5%	652,867 (252,073)	
13	Thailand	1.2%	513,120 (198,120)	
14	Turkmenistan	1.1%	488,100 (188,500)	
15	Yemen	1.0%	455,503 (175,871)	
16	Uzbekistan	1.0%	447,400 (172,700)	
17	Iraq	1.0%	438,317 (169,235)	
18	Japan	0.8%	377,976 (145,937)	
19	Vietnam	0.7%	331,212 (127,882)	
20	Malaysia	0.7%	330,803 (127,724)	
21	Oman	0.7%	309,500 (119,500)	
22	Philippines	0.7%	300,000 (120,000)	
23	Laos	0.5%	236,800 (91,400)	
24	Kyrgyzstan	0.4%	199,951 (77,202)	
25	Syria	0.4%	185,180 (71,500)	(Note: Including the Golan Heights.)
26	Cambodia	0.4%	181,035 (69,898)	
27	Bangladesh	0.3%	148,460 (57,320)	
28	Nepal	0.3%	147,516 (56,956)	
29	Tajikistan	0.3%	143,100 (55,300)	
30	North Korea	0.3%	120,540 (46,540)	
31	South Korea	0.2%	100,210 (38,690)	
32	Jordan	0.2%	89,342 (34,495)	
33	United Arab Emirates	0.2%	83,600 (32,300)	
34	Azerbaijan	0.2%	79,640 (30,750)	(Note: Figure excludes the Guba-Khachmaz Economic Region. Total area is 86,600 (33,400) including European part. Located in the Caucasus, between Europe and Asia.)
35	Georgia	0.2%	69,700 (26,900)	(Note: Located in the Caucasus, between Europe and Asia. Varying definitions place Georgia almost entirely within either continent. Includes Abkhazia and South Ossetia.)
36	Sri Lanka	0.1%	65,610 (25,330)	
37	Egypt	0.1%	61,000 (24,000)	(Note: Figure is for the Sinai Peninsula. Total area is 1,010,408 (390,121) including the African part.)
38	Bhutan	0.1%	38,394 (14,824)	
—	Taiwan	0.1%	36,193 (13,974)	(Note: Total area under the jurisdiction of the Government of the Republic of China.)
39	Armenia	0.1%	29,743 (11,484)	(Note: Located in the South Caucasus, between Asia and Europe. Smallest landlocked country in Asia.)
40	Israel	0.05%	22,070 (8,520)	(Note: Excluding the Gaza Strip and the West Bank, but including East Jerusalem and the Golan Heights.)
41	Kuwait	0.04%	17,818 (6,880)	
42	Timor Leste	0.03%	14,919 (5,760)	
43	Qatar	0.03%	11,586 (4,473)	
44	Lebanon	0.02%	10,452 (4,036)	
45	Palestine	0.01%	6,220 (2,400)	(Note: Including the Gaza Strip and the West Bank.)
46	Brunei	0.01%	5,765 (2,226)	
47	Bahrain	0.002%	786 (303)	
48	Singapore	0.002%	728 (281)	
49	Maldives	0.001%	298 (115)	(Note: Smallest country by area in Asia.)
	Total	100%	44,664,340 (17,245,000)	

== See also ==
- List of Asian countries by population
- List of countries and dependencies by area
- List of European countries by area
- List of metropolitan areas in Asia
