= List of Oceanian countries by area =

Regional geographical ranking

Map of Oceania

Below is a list of countries and dependencies in Oceania by area. Australia is the largest country in Oceania, while Nauru is the smallest.

== List ==
	Country / dependency	% total	Oceania area in km^{2} (mi^{2})
1	Australia	86.1%	7,692,024 (2,969,907)
2	Papua New Guinea	5.2%	462,840 (178,700)
—	Western New Guinea (Indonesia)	4.7%	416,060 (160,640)
3	New Zealand	3.0%	268,107 (103,517)
4	Solomon Islands	0.3%	28,896 (11,157)
—	New Caledonia (France)	0.2%	19,100 (7,400)
5	Fiji	0.2%	18,272 (7,055)
—	Hawaii (United States)	0.1%	16,638 (6,424)
6	Vanuatu	0.1%	12,189 (4,706)
—	French Polynesia (France)	0.04%	3,687 (1,424)
7	Samoa	0.03%	2,842 (1,097)
8	Tonga	0.01%	747 (288)
9	Kiribati	0.01%	726 (280)
10	Micronesia	0.01%	702 (271)
—	Guam (United States)	0.01%	541 (209)
11	Palau	0.01%	459 (177)
—	Northern Mariana Islands (United States)	0.01%	457 (176)
12	Niue	0.003%	260 (100)
13	Cook Islands	0.003%	236 (91)
—	American Samoa (United States)	0.002%	199 (77)
14	Marshall Islands	0.002%	181 (70)
—	Easter Island (Chile)	0.002%	163 (63)
—	Wallis and Futuna (France)	0.002%	142 (55)
—	Christmas Island (Australia)	0.002%	135 (52)
—	Norfolk Island (Australia)	0.0004%	36 (14)
15	Tuvalu	0.0003%	26 (10)
16	Nauru	0.0002%	21 (8.1)
—	Cocos (Keeling) Islands (Australia)	0.0002%	14 (5.4)
—	Tokelau (New Zealand)	0.0001%	12 (4.6)
—	Pitcairn Islands (United Kingdom)	0.0001%	5 (1.9)
	Total	100%	8,935,502 (3,450,017)

== See also ==
- List of countries and dependencies by area
- List of Oceanian countries by population
