= List of North American countries by population =

This is a list of North American countries and dependencies by population in North America, total projected population from the United Nations and the latest official figure.

As of 2025 most citizens of North America live in the United States or Mexico with the two countries making up 77.6% of the population of North America.

== Map ==
North America population by country
1. United States (56.3%)
2. Mexico (21.3%)
3. Canada (6.40%)
4. Guatemala (3.00%)
5. Haiti (1.90%)
6. Dominican Republic (1.90%)
7. Cuba (1.90%)
8. Others (7.30%)

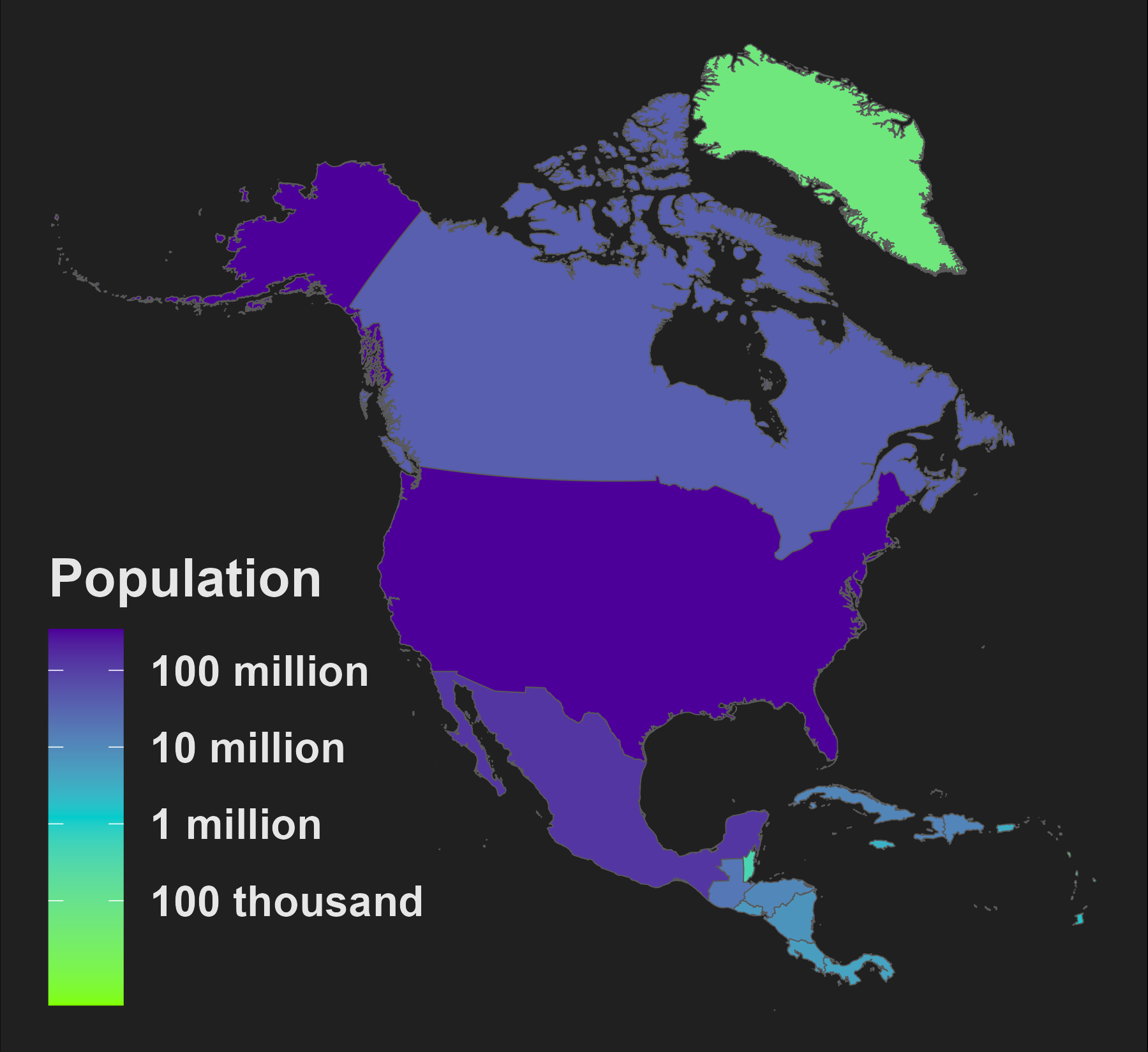
North American countries by population, 2023

== Table ==
	Country / dependency	% total	North America population	% change	Official figure	Official date	
1	United States	56.3%	339,996,564	0.5%	333,287,557	1 Jul 2022	(Note: Includes the 50 states and the District of Columbia, but excludes the territories of the United States.)
2	Mexico	21.3%	128,455,567	0.7%	129,035,733	1 Jan 2023	
3	Canada	6.4%	38,781,292	2.9%	39,566,248	1 Jan 2023	
4	Guatemala	3.0%	18,092,026	1.4%	17,602,431	1 Jul 2023	
5	Haiti	1.9%	11,724,764	1.2%	9,801,664	1 Jul 2012	
6	Dominican Republic	1.9%	11,332,973	0.9%	10,711,155	1 Jul 2023	
7	Cuba	1.9%	11,194,449	-0.2%	11,113,215	1 Jul 2023	
8	Honduras	1.8%	10,593,798	1.5%	9,745,100	1 Jul 2023	
9	Nicaragua	1.2%	7,046,311	1.4%	6,664,364	30 Jun 2021	
10	El Salvador	1.1%	6,364,943	0.5%	6,765,800	30 Jun 2020	
11	Costa Rica	0.9%	5,212,173	0.6%	5,163,021	30 Jun 2020	
12	Panama	0.7%	4,468,087	1.3%	4,278,500	1 Jul 2020	
	Puerto Rico (US)	0.5%	3,260,314	0.2%	3,221,789	1 Jul 2022	
13	Jamaica	0.5%	2,825,544	-0.1%	2,734,092	1 Jul 2019	
14	Trinidad and Tobago	0.3%	1,534,937	0.3%	1,365,805	30 Jun 2022	
15	Bahamas	0.1%	412,624	0.6%	395,640	1 Jul 2019	
16	Belize	0.1%	410,825	1.4%	441,471	1 Jul 2022	
	Guadeloupe (France)	0.1%	395,839	0.0%	375,845	1 Jan 2023	
	Martinique (France)	0.1%	366,981	-0.1%	347,686	1 Jan 2023	
17	Barbados	0.05%	281,996	0.1%	277,821	1 May 2010	
	Curaçao (NL)	0.03%	192,077	0.5%	148,925	1 Jan 2023	
18	Saint Lucia	0.03%	180,251	0.2%	178,696	1 Jul 2018	
19	Grenada	0.02%	126,184	0.6%	112,579	1 Jul 2019	
	Aruba (NL)	0.02%	106,277	-0.2%	107,457	31 Dec 2021	
20	Saint Vincent and the Grenadines	0.02%	103,699	-0.2%	110,418	1 Jul 2022	
	US Virgin Islands (US)	0.02%	98,750	-0.7%	87,146	1 Apr 2020	
21	Antigua and Barbuda	0.02%	94,298	0.6%	100,772	1 Jan 2022	
22	Dominica	0.01%	73,040	0.4%	71,293	14 May 2011	
	Cayman Islands (UK)	0.01%	69,310	0.9%	71,432	10 Oct 2021	
	Bermuda (UK)	0.01%	64,069	-0.2%	63,982	1 Jul 2023	
	Greenland (Denmark)	0.01%	56,643	0.3%	50,145	1 Apr 2023	
23	Saint Kitts and Nevis	0.01%	47,755	0.2%	47,195	15 May 2011	
	Turks and Caicos Islands (UK)	0.01%	46,062	0.8%	46,131	1 Jul 2021	
	Sint Maarten (NL)	0.01%	44,222	0.1%	42,938	1 Jan 2023	
	Saint Martin (France)	0.01%	32,077	0.9%	32,358	1 Jan 2020	
	British Virgin Islands (UK)	0.01%	31,538	0.7%	28,054	12 Jul 2010	
	Caribbean Netherlands (NL)	0.004%	27,148	0.4%	27,726	1 Jan 2022	
	Anguilla (UK)	0.003%	15,900	0.3%	15,780	1 Dec 2022	
	Saint Barthélemy (France)	0.002%	10,994	0.2%	10,585	1 Jan 2020	
	Saint Pierre and Miquelon (France)	0.001%	5,840	-0.4%	6,092	1 Jan 2020	
	Montserrat (UK)	0.001%	4,387	-0.1%	4,433	1 Jul 2022	
	Total	100%	604,182,528	0.6%	594,259,074		

== See also ==
- Demographics of North America
- List of North American countries by population growth rate
- List of North American countries by area
- List of North American countries by life expectancy
