= List of South American countries by population =

This is a list of South American countries and dependencies by population in South America, total projected population from the United Nations and the latest official figure.

== Map ==
South America population by country
1. Brazil (49.2%)
2. Colombia (11.8%)
3. Argentina (10.4%)
4. Peru (7.80%)
5. Venezuela (6.60%)
6. Chile (4.50%)
7. Ecuador (4.10%)
8. Bolivia (2.80%)

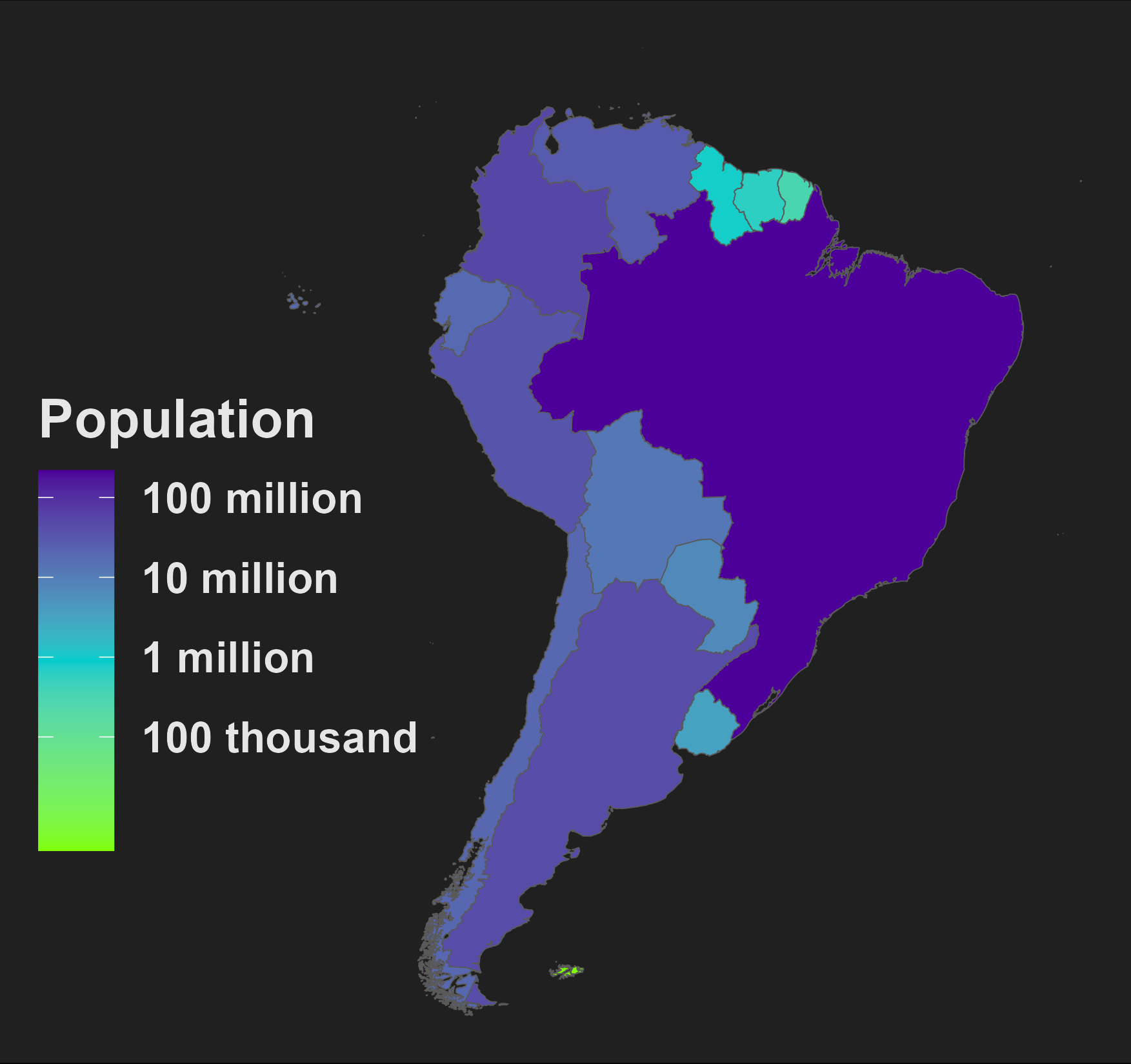
South American countries by population, 2023

== Table ==
	Country / dependency	% total	South America population	% change	Official figure	Official date
1	Brazil	49.2%	216,422,446	0.5%	216,284,269	1 Jul 2023
2	Colombia	11.8%	52,085,168	0.4%	52,215,503	17 Mar 2023
3	Argentina	10.4%	45,773,884	0.6%	46,044,703	18 May 2022
4	Peru	7.8%	34,352,719	0.9%	33,725,844	30 Jun 2023
5	Venezuela	6.6%	28,838,499	1.9%	32,219,500	30 Jun 2019
6	Chile	4.5%	19,629,590	0.1%	19,960,889	30 Jun 2023
7	Ecuador	4.1%	18,190,484	1.1%	17,510,643	1 Jul 2020
8	Bolivia	2.8%	12,388,571	1.4%	12,006,031	1 Jul 2022
9	Paraguay	1.6%	6,861,524	1.2%	7,453,695	1 Jul 2023
10	Uruguay	0.8%	3,423,109	0.0%	3,566,549	1 Jul 2023
11	Guyana	0.2%	813,834	0.6%	743,699	1 Jul 2019
12	Suriname	0.1%	628,785	0.8%	598,000	1 Jul 2023
	French Guiana (France)	0.1%	312,155	2.5%	301,099	1 Jan 2023
	Falkland Islands (UK)	0.001%	3,791	0.3%	3541	10 Oct 2021
	Total	100%	439,719,011	0.3%	442,633,965	

== See also ==
- Demographics of South America
- List of South American countries by area
- List of South American countries by life expectancy
