= List of Oceanian countries by population =

Regional population ranking

This is a list of Oceanian countries and dependencies by population in Oceania, which includes Australasia, Melanesia, Micronesia, and Polynesia. Projections are from the United Nations and official figures are from the Pacific Community and other official sources.

== Map ==
Oceania population by country
1. Australia (50.2%)
2. Papua New Guinea (19.6%)
3. Western New Guinea (10.7%)
4. New Zealand (9.90%)
5. Hawaii (2.70%)
6. Fiji (1.80%)
7. Solomon Islands (1.40%)

Subregions (Australasia, Melanesia, Micronesia, and Polynesia), as well as sovereign states and dependent territories of Oceania

== Table ==
	Country / dependency	% total	Oceania population	% growth	Official figure	Official date	
1	Australia	50.2%	26,439,112	1.0%	26,598,311	31 Dec 2022	
2	Papua New Guinea	19.6%	10,329,931	1.8%	10,329,931	23 Jun 2022	
	(Indonesia) Western New Guinea (ID)	10.7%	5,628,545	0.5%	5,628,545	30 Jun 2023	
3	New Zealand	9.9%	5,228,100	0.8%	5,177,574	31 Mar 2023	
	Hawaii (US)	2.7%	1,440,196	-0.1%	1,440,196	1 Jul 2022	(Note: Figures are for 2022.)
4	Fiji	1.8%	936,376	0.7%	901,603	23 Jun 2022	
5	Solomon Islands	1.4%	740,425	2.2%	744,407	24 Jun 2022	
6	Vanuatu	0.6%	334,506	2.4%	307,941	25 Jun 2022	
	French Polynesia (FR)	0.6%	308,872	0.8%	280,855	26 Jun 2022	
	New Caledonia (FR)	0.6%	292,991	1.0%	274,330	27 Jun 2022	
7	Samoa	0.4%	225,681	1.5%	200,999	28 Jun 2022	
	Guam (US)	0.3%	172,952	0.7%	153,836	1 Apr 2020	
8	Kiribati	0.3%	133,515	1.7%	122,735	23 Jun 2022	
9	Micronesia	0.2%	115,224	0.9%	105,987	23 Jun 2022	
10	Tonga	0.2%	107,773	0.9%	100,179	30 Nov 2021	
	Northern Mariana Islands (US)	0.1%	49,796	0.5%	47,329	1 Apr 2020	
	American Samoa (US)	0.1%	43,915	-0.8%	49,710	1 Apr 2020	
11	Marshall Islands	0.1%	41,996	1.0%	39,262	7 Jul 2021	
12	Palau	0.03%	18,058	0.0%	16,733	1 Jul 2021	
13	Cook Islands	0.03%	17,044	0.2%	15,040	1 Dec 2021	
14	Nauru	0.02%	12,780	0.9%	11,832	23 Jun 2022	
	Wallis and Futuna (FR)	0.02%	11,502	-0.6%	11,369	23 Jun 2022	
15	Tuvalu	0.02%	11,396	0.7%	10,679	23 Jun 2022	
	Easter Island (CL)	0.02%	8,743	1.7%	8,743	1 Jul 2023	
16	Niue	0.004%	1,935	0.1%	1,549	23 Jun 2022	
	Tokelau (NZ)	0.004%	1,893	1.2%	1,647	12 Dec 2019	
	Pitcairn Islands (UK)	0.0001%	50	0.0%	50	1 Jul 2020	
	Total	100%	52,653,307	1.1%	52,581,372		

== See also ==
- List of Oceanian countries by area
- List of Oceanian countries by life expectancy
