= List of Asian countries by population =

This is a list of Asian countries and dependencies by population, total projected population from the United Nations and the latest official figure.

== Map ==
Asia population by country
1. India (29.9%)
2. China (29.9%)
3. Indonesia (5.70%)
4. Pakistan (5.00%)
5. Bangladesh (3.60%)
6. Japan (2.60%)
7. Philippines (2.50%)
8. Vietnam (2.10%)
9. Others (18.7%)

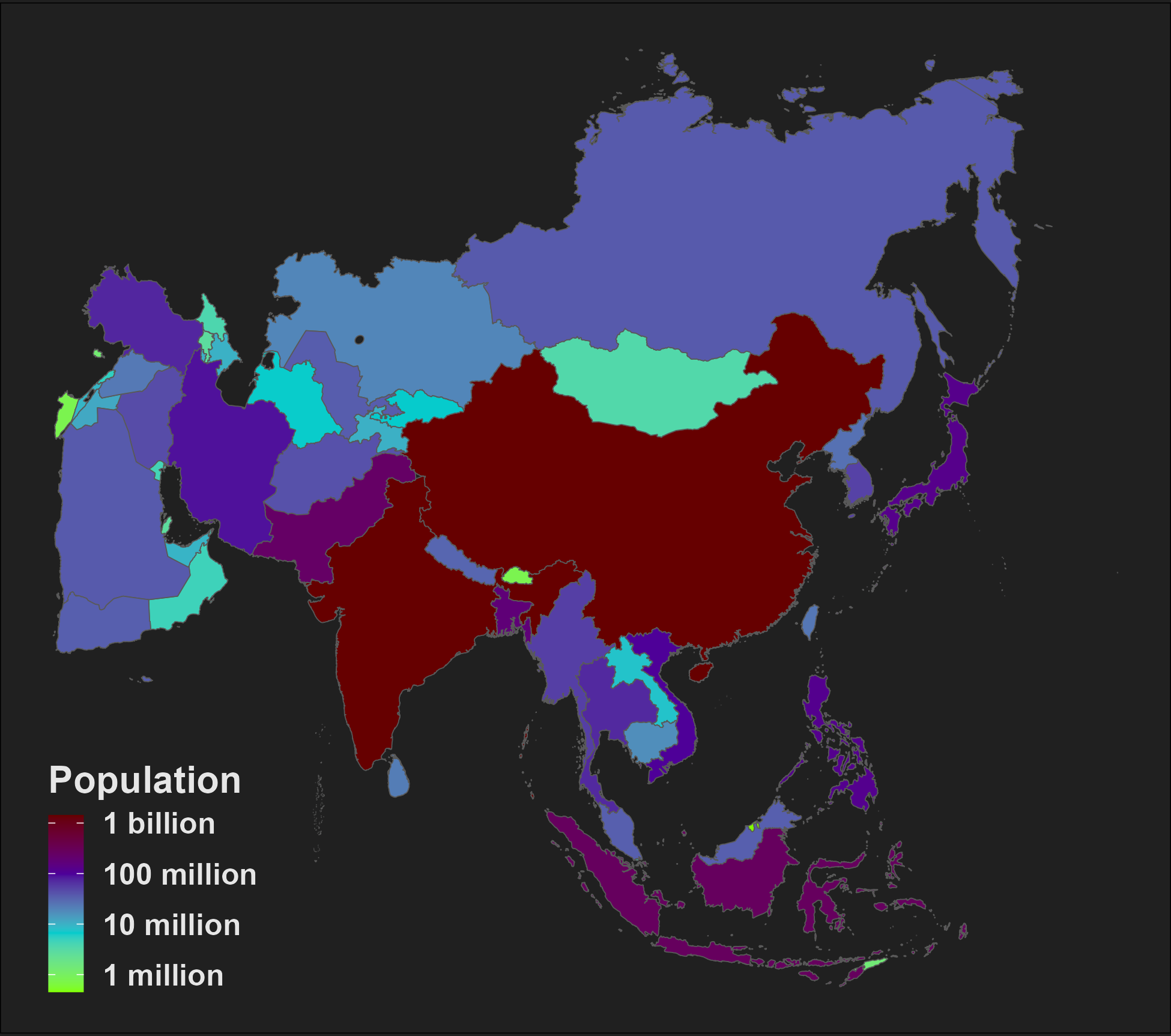
Asian countries by population, 2023

== Table ==
	Country / dependency	% Asia	Asian population	Total population	% growth	Official figure	Official date	
1	India	29.9%	1,428,627,663	1,428,627,663	0.8%	1,388,163,000	1 Jul 2023	(Note: The most populous country in the world. Includes the population of the India-administered union territories of Jammu and Kashmir and Ladakh.)
2	China	29.9%	1,425,671,352	1,425,671,352	0.0%	1,409,670,000	31 Dec 2023	(Note: Refers to mainland China and excludes the special administrative regions of Hong Kong and Macau.)
3	Indonesia	5.7%	272,096,348	277,534,123	0.7%	277,749,853	31 Dec 2022	(Note: Asian population excludes Western New Guinea. Transcontinental country mainly in Southeast Asia and partly in Oceania.)
4	Pakistan	5.0%	240,485,658	240,485,658	2.5%	241,499,431	2023	(Note: Includes the population of the Pakistan-administered Azad Kashmir and Gilgit-Baltistan.)
5	Bangladesh	3.6%	172,954,319	172,954,319	1.0%	169,828,911	15 Jun 2022	
6	Japan	2.6%	123,294,513	123,294,513	-0.3%	124,352,000	1 Oct 2023	
7	Philippines	2.5%	117,337,368	117,337,368	1.5%	110,596,059	13 May 2023	
8	Vietnam	2.1%	98,858,950	98,858,950	0.7%	99,460,000	1 Jul 2022	
9	Iran	1.9%	89,172,767	89,172,767	0.7%	85,054,189	16 May 2023	
10	Turkey	1.5%	73,568,471	85,816,199	0.6%	85,279,553	31 Dec 2022	(Note: Asian population excludes East Thrace. Transcontinental country straddling Western Asia and a small portion of Southeast Europe.)
11	Thailand	1.5%	71,801,279	71,801,279	0.1%	68,263,022	1 Jul 2021	
12	Myanmar	1.1%	54,577,997	54,577,997	0.7%	56,067,251	15 May 2023	
13	South Korea	1.1%	51,784,059	51,784,059	-0.1%	51,408,155	1 Apr 2023	
14	Iraq	1.0%	45,504,560	45,504,560	2.3%	43,324,000	1 Jul 2023	
15	Afghanistan	0.9%	42,239,854	42,239,854	2.7%	32,890,171	1 Jun 2020	
16	Russia	0.8%	37,069,254	144,444,359	-0.2%	146,447,424	1 Jan 2023	(Note: Asian population includes only the Ural, Siberian and Far Eastern federal districts comprising North Asia. Total population includes the Republic of Crimea and Sevastopol. Russia is a transcontinental country straddling Eastern Europe and Northern Asia.)
17	Saudi Arabia	0.8%	36,947,025	36,947,025	1.5%	34,110,821	1 Jul 2021	
18	Uzbekistan	0.7%	35,163,944	35,163,944	1.5%	35,271,300	1 Jan 2022	
19	Yemen	0.7%	34,449,825	34,449,825	2.2%	31,890,000	1 Jul 2022	
20	Malaysia	0.7%	34,308,525	34,308,525	1.1%	32,697,494	16 May 2023	
21	Nepal	0.6%	30,896,590	30,896,590	1.1%	29,164,578	25 Nov 2021	
22	North Korea	0.5%	26,160,822	26,160,822	0.4%	25,850,000	1 Jul 2023	
23	Taiwan	0.5%	23,923,277	23,923,277	0.1%	23,347,374	30 Apr 2023	(Note: Taiwan is a widely but partially recognised country.)
24	Syria	0.5%	23,227,014	23,227,014	5.0%	22,923,000	1 Jul 2021	
25	Sri Lanka	0.5%	21,893,579	21,893,579	0.3%	22,181,000	1 Jul 2022	
26	Kazakhstan	0.4%	19,014,710	19,606,634	1.1%	19,832,737	1 Jan 2023	(Note: Asian population excludes the portions of West Kahakhstan and Atyrau that lie entirely west of the Ural River. Transcontinental country mainly located in Central Asia and partly in Eastern Europe.)
27	Cambodia	0.4%	16,944,826	16,944,826	1.1%	15,552,211	3 Mar 2019	
28	Jordan	0.2%	11,337,053	11,337,053	0.5%	11,392,242	16 May 2023	
29	United Arab Emirates	0.2%	10,678,556	10,678,556	0.8%	9,503,738	1 Jul 2019	
30	Tajikistan	0.2%	10,143,543	10,143,543	1.9%	9,313,800	1 Jan 2020	
31	Israel	0.2%	10,003,232	10,003,232	1.5%	9,915,511	26 Sept 2024	
32	Azerbaijan	0.2%	9,886,952	10,412,652	0.5%	10,135,373	1 Mar 2023	(Note: Asian population excludes the Guba-Khachmaz Economic Region. Transcontinental country straddling Western Asia and Eastern Europe.)
33	Laos	0.2%	7,633,779	7,633,779	1.4%	7,231,200	1 Jul 2020	
	Hong Kong (China)	0.2%	7,491,609	7,491,609	0.0%	7,413,070	30 Jun 2021	
34	Kyrgyzstan	0.1%	6,735,348	6,735,348	1.6%	7,100,000	1 Apr 2023	
35	Turkmenistan	0.1%	6,516,100	6,516,100	1.3%	4,751,120	26 Dec 2012	
36	Singapore	0.1%	6,014,723	6,014,723	0.7%	5,637,000	30 Jun 2022	
37	Palestine	0.1%	5,371,230	5,371,230	2.3%	5,483,450	1 Jan 2023	(Note: Comprises the Gaza Strip and the West Bank. Palestine is a widely but partially recognised country.)
38	Lebanon	0.1%	5,353,930	5,353,930	-2.5%	5,416,225	31 Dec 2017	
39	Oman	0.1%	4,644,384	4,644,384	1.5%	4,471,148	12 Dec 2020	
40	Kuwait	0.1%	4,310,108	4,310,108	1.0%	4,670,713	31 Dec 2020	
41	Georgia	0.1%	3,728,282	3,728,282	-0.4%	3,736,400	1 Jan 2023	(Note: Transcontinental country mostly in Western Asia with a small part in Eastern Europe.)
42	Mongolia	0.1%	3,447,157	3,447,157	1.4%	3,457,548	12 Dec 2022	
43	Armenia	0.1%	2,777,971	2,777,971	-0.1%	2,981,200	1 Jan 2023	
44	Qatar	0.1%	2,716,391	2,716,391	0.8%	2,956,261	1 Apr 2023	
45	Bahrain	0.03%	1,485,510	1,485,510	0.9%	1,472,204	17 Mar 2020	
46	Timor-Leste	0.03%	1,360,596	1,360,596	1.4%	1,354,662	1 Jul 2023	
47	Cyprus	0.03%	1,260,138	1,260,138	0.7%	918,100	1 Oct 2021	
48	Bhutan	0.02%	787,425	787,425	0.6%	770,276	1 Jan 2023	
	Macau (China)	0.01%	704,150	704,150	1.3%	673,600	31 Mar 2023	
49	Maldives	0.01%	527,799	527,799	0.05%	523,787	2022	
50	Brunei	0.01%	452,524	452,524	0.8%	440,715	31 Dec 2021	
	Total	100%	4,772,122,568	5,010,243,461	0.6%	4,886,949,737		

== See also ==
- Demographics of Asia
- List of Asian countries by area
- List of Asian countries by population growth rate
- List of Asian countries by life expectancy
- List of countries and dependencies by population
