= List of South American countries by area =

Below is a list of countries and dependencies in South America by area. Brazil is the largest country in South America while Suriname is the smallest.

Panama is not regarded as a transcontinental country but the country is sometimes included in South America due to being part of Colombia prior to its secession in 1903. The island of Trinidad is sometimes included in South America, which then makes Trinidad and Tobago a transcontinental country.

Location	% total	Area km^{2}	Area mi^{2}
South America	100%	17,830,199	6,884,275
Brazil	48%	8,510,346	3,285,862
Argentina	16%	2,796,427	1,079,706
Peru	7%	1,285,217	496,224
Colombia	6%	1,141,748	440,831
Bolivia	6%	1,098,581	424,164
Venezuela	5%	929,690	358,955
Chile	4%	756,102	291,932
Paraguay	2%	406,752	157,048
Ecuador	1%	257,215	99,311
Guyana	1%	214,969	83,000
Uruguay	1%	173,626	67,037
Suriname	0.9%	163,820	63,251
French Guiana (France)	0.5%	83,534	32,253
Falkland Islands (United Kingdom)	0.1%	12,173	4,700

== See also ==
- List of countries and dependencies by area
- List of South American countries by population
