= List of North American countries by population growth rate =

The list is based on CIA World Factbook estimates. Countries or dependent territories without a 2017 estimate are omitted.

== List ==
CIA World Factbook (2017)

Rank	Country	Annual growth (%)
1	British Virgin Islands	2.25
2	Turks and Caicos Islands	2.16
3	Cayman Islands	2.01
4	Anguilla	1.97
5	Belize	1.80
6	Guatemala	1.75
7	Honduras	1.60
8	Sint Maarten	1.42
9	Haiti	1.34
10	Aruba	1.27
10	Panama	1.27
12	Antigua and Barbuda	1.21
13	Dominican Republic	1.18
14	Costa Rica	1.16
15	Mexico	1.12
16	Nicaragua	0.98
17	Bahamas	0.81
18	United States	0.81
19	Canada	0.73
19	Saint Kitts and Nevis	0.73
21	Jamaica	0.68
22	Bermuda	0.45
22	Montserrat	0.45
24	Grenada	0.44
25	Curaçao	0.40
26	Saint Lucia	0.32
27	Barbados	0.28
28	El Salvador	0.25
29	Dominica	0.18
30	Greenland	-0.03
31	Trinidad and Tobago	-0.20
32	Saint Vincent and the Grenadines	-0.25
32	United States Virgin Islands	-0.25
34	Cuba	-0.29
35	Saint Pierre and Miquelon	-1.08
36	Puerto Rico	-1.74
