= List of currencies in the Americas =

There are 39 currencies currently in official use in the Americas. All de jure present currencies in the Americas are listed here, including currencies from countries which are not sovereign states or dependencies.

A commonly used currency in the Americas is the United States dollar. It is the world's largest reserve currency, the resulting economic value of which benefits the U.S. at over $100 billion annually. However, its position as a reserve currency damages American exporters because this increases the value of the United States dollar. The United States dollar is also "standard" in international commodity markets. In the phenomenon known as 'dollarization', the U.S. dollar has been adopted as the official currency of several other countries. However, semi-dollarization also exists in a few other countries where the U.S. dollar is recognised as legal tender alongside another currency, and unofficial dollarization exists in many areas where the U.S. dollar is widely used and accepted-although it is not recognised as legal tender. Ecuador uses the United States dollar (the French overseas department French Guiana uses the euro, the currency of France).

The Brazilian real is considered a strong South American currency; under presidents Luiz Inácio Lula da Silva and Dilma Rousseff, the real almost tripled in value, resulting in a vast change in economics, with many people who were middle class benefiting greatly. The minimum wage was raised, and Brazil's position as a leading exporter of raw materials, including soya beans and iron ore was underlined, but they are responsible for Brazil's improved economy, which damaged the "competitiveness of manufacturing", reducing the amount of exports.

The Chilean currency, the Chilean peso, is also strong. However, this again means that manufacturing struggles, as cheaper imports are pricing them out of business. In January 2011, after Chile announced that in 2011 the country planned to buy foreign reserves of $12 billion, the peso experienced an immediate fall in value. The country's main export is copper to China and India. The currency strength has resulted in over-high wages, and high inflation.

The East Caribbean dollar is the most used currency by the number of countries in the Caribbean utilizing it. The East Caribbean dollar is pegged to the United States dollar, and has been for over 35 years since 1976, having previously been pegged to the pound sterling. In 1965, the Eastern Caribbean Currency Authority was established (coming after the British Caribbean Currency Board), to distribute currency, but The Bahamas withdrew from the organisation to create its own bank. The East Caribbean dollar is used in all seven member countries of the Organisation of Eastern Caribbean States (OECS) and Anguilla (a British overseas territory); the only OECS member using a different currency is the British Virgin Islands, a British overseas territory where the U.S. dollar is the official currency. Cuba and Panama both use two currencies. Cuba is attempting to gradually phase out the Cuban convertible peso, unifying the two in the Cuban peso. Although there is no confirmed timescale for the reform, whilst quoting Cuban economists, Reuters gave an estimation of 18 months (from October 2013). Panama uses the United States dollar informally, but additionally uses the Panamanian balboa as legal tender.

== American sovereign state currencies ==
List of all American sovereign state currencies
Present currency	Country or dependency (administrating country)	Currency sign	Fractional unit	Ref(s)
Aruban florin	Aruba (Netherlands)	ƒ	Cent	
Argentine peso	Argentina	$	Centavo	
Bahamian dollar	The Bahamas	$	Cent	
Barbadian dollar (also called Bajan dollar)	Barbados	$	Cent	
Bermudian dollar	Bermuda (United Kingdom)	$	Cent	
Belize dollar	Belize	$	Cent	
Bolivian boliviano	Bolivia	Bs	Centavo	
Brazilian real	Brazil	R$	Centavo	,
Canadian dollar	Canada	CA$	Cent	
Cayman Islands dollar	Cayman Islands (United Kingdom)	$	Cent	
Chilean peso	Chile	$	Centavo	
Colombian peso	Colombia	$	Centavo	
Costa Rican colón	Costa Rica	₡	Céntimo	
Cuban peso	Cuba	CUC$	Centavo	
Danish krone	Greenland (Denmark)	kr	Øre	
Dominican peso	Dominican Republic	RD$	Centavo	
East Caribbean dollar	Antigua and Barbuda	$	Cent	
East Caribbean dollar	Dominica	$	Cent	
East Caribbean dollar	Grenada	$	Cent	
East Caribbean dollar	Montserrat (United Kingdom)	$	Cent	
East Caribbean dollar	Saint Vincent and the Grenadines	$	Cent	
East Caribbean dollar	Saint Kitts and Nevis	$	Cent	
East Caribbean dollar	Saint Lucia	$	Cent	
Euro	French Guiana (France)	€	Cent	
Euro	Guadeloupe (France)	€	Cent	
Euro	Martinique (France)	€	Cent	
Euro	Saint Martin (France)	€	Cent	
Falkland Islands pound	Falkland Islands (United Kingdom)	£	Pence	
Guatemalan quetzal	Guatemala	Q	Centavo	
Guyanese dollar	Guyana	$, G$	Cent	
Haitian gourde	Haiti	G	Centime	
Honduran lempira	Honduras	L	Centavo	
Jamaican dollar	Jamaica	J$	Cent	
Mexican peso	Mexico	$	Centavo	
Caribbean guilder	Curaçao (Netherlands)	Cg	Cent	
Caribbean guilder	Sint Maarten (Netherlands)	Cg	Cent	
Nicaraguan córdoba	Nicaragua	C$	Centavo	
Panamanian balboa	Panama	B/.	Centésimo	
Paraguayan guaraní	Paraguay	₲	Céntimo	
Peruvian sol	Peru	S/.	Céntimo	
Surinamese dollar	Suriname	$	Cent	
Trinidad and Tobago dollar	Trinidad and Tobago	TT$	Cent	
United Kingdom pound	South Georgia and the South Sandwich Islands (United Kingdom)	£	Pence	
United States dollar	Bonaire (Netherlands)	$	Cent	
United States dollar	British Virgin Islands (United Kingdom)	$	Cent	
United States dollar	Ecuador	$	Cent	
United States dollar	El Salvador	$	Cent	
United States dollar	Panama	$	Cent	
United States dollar	Puerto Rico (United States)	$	Cent	
United States dollar	Saba (Netherlands)	$	Cent	
United States dollar	Sint Eustatius (Netherlands)	$	Cent	
United States dollar	Turks and Caicos Islands (United Kingdom)	$	Cent	
United States dollar	United States	$	Cent	
United States dollar	United States Virgin Islands (United States)	$	Cent	
Uruguayan peso	Uruguay	$U	Centésimo	
Venezuelan bolívar	Venezuela	Bs.	Céntimo	

== See also ==
- Central banks and currencies of the Americas
- List of circulating currencies
