= Central banks and currencies of the Americas =

List of banks and currencies

This is a list of central banks and currencies of the Americas.

Country	Currency	Central bank	Peg
Anguilla	Eastern Caribbean dollar	Eastern Caribbean Central Bank	2.70 XCD = 1 USD
Antigua and Barbuda	Eastern Caribbean dollar	Eastern Caribbean Central Bank	2.70 XCD = 1 USD
Dominica	Eastern Caribbean dollar	Eastern Caribbean Central Bank	2.70 XCD = 1 USD
Grenada	Eastern Caribbean dollar	Eastern Caribbean Central Bank	2.70 XCD = 1 USD
Montserrat	Eastern Caribbean dollar	Eastern Caribbean Central Bank	2.70 XCD = 1 USD
Saint Kitts and Nevis	Eastern Caribbean dollar	Eastern Caribbean Central Bank	2.70 XCD = 1 USD
Saint Lucia	Eastern Caribbean dollar	Eastern Caribbean Central Bank	2.70 XCD = 1 USD
Saint Vincent and the Grenadines	Eastern Caribbean dollar	Eastern Caribbean Central Bank	2.70 XCD = 1 USD
Argentina	Argentine peso	Banco Central de la República Argentina	
Aruba	Aruban florin	Central Bank of Aruba	1.79 AWG = 1.00 USD
Belize	Belize dollar	Central Bank of Belize	2 BZD = 1 USD
Bermuda	Bermudan dollar	Bermuda Monetary Authority	1 BMD = 1 USD
Bolivia	Bolivian boliviano	Banco Central de Bolivia	
Brazil	Brazilian real	Banco Central do Brasil	
Canada	Canadian dollar	Bank of Canada	
Chile	Chilean peso	Banco Central de Chile	
Colombia	Colombian peso	Banco de la República	
Costa Rica	Costa Rican colón	Banco Central de Costa Rica	
Curaçao	Caribbean guilder	Central Bank of Curaçao and Sint Maarten	1.79 XCG = 1.00 USD
Sint Maarten	Caribbean guilder	Central Bank of Curaçao and Sint Maarten	1.79 XCG = 1.00 USD
El Salvador	United States dollar	Banco Central de Reserva de El Salvador	
Ecuador	United States dollar	Banco Central del Ecuador	
Falkland Islands	Falkland Islands pound	Government of the Falkland Islands	1 FKP = 1 GBP
French Guiana	Euro	European Central Bank	
Greenland	Danish krone	Danmarks Nationalbank	1 EUR = 7.46038 kr
Guatemala	Guatemalan quetzal	Banco de Guatemala	
Guyana	Guyanese dollar	Bank of Guyana	
Honduras	Honduran lempira	Banco Central de Honduras	
Mexico	Mexican peso	Banco de México	
Nicaragua	Nicaraguan córdoba	Banco Central de Nicaragua	
Panama	United States dollar	Banco Nacional de Panamá	
Paraguay	Paraguayan guaraní	Banco Central del Paraguay	
Peru	Peruvian sol	Banco Central de Reserva del Perú	
Suriname	Surinamese dollar	Centrale Bank van Suriname	
Uruguay	Uruguayan peso	Banco Central del Uruguay	
Venezuela	Venezuelan bolívar	Banco Central de Venezuela	
United States	United States dollar	Federal Reserve Bank	

== See also ==
- List of currencies in the Americas
- United Nations Economic Commission for Latin America and the Caribbean (ECLAC)
- Economy of North America
- Economy of South America
- Latin America § Economy
